= List of people with given name Andrew =

This is a list of notable people with the given name Andrew.

== Saints ==
In the Christian Bible, Saint Andrew was the earliest disciple of Jesus and one of the twelve Apostles.

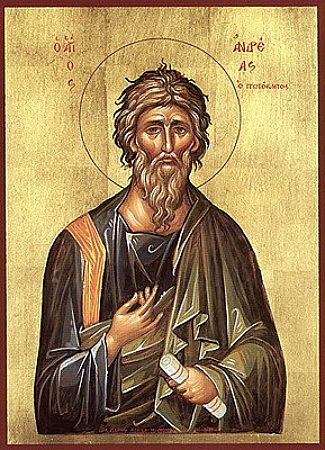
Saint Andrew

Other saints named Andrew include:

- Saint Andrew of Trier (died 235), Bishop of Trier
- Saints Peter, Andrew, Paul, and Denise, 3rd-century martyrs of the Eastern Orthodox and Catholic Churches
- Saint Andrew of Crete (c. 650–712 or 726 or 740), archbishop, theologian, homilist, and hymnographer
- Saint Andrew of Crete (martyr) (died 766/7)
- Saint Andrew the Fool (died 936), Byzantine saint of the Eastern Orthodox Church
- Saints Andrew Dũng-Lạc (1795–1839), Andrew Thong Kim Nguyen, Andrew Trong Van Tram, and Andrew Tuong of the Vietnamese Martyrs
- Saint Andrew Kim Taegon (1821–1846), of the Korean Martyrs

== Royalty and nobility ==
- Andrew I of Hungary (c. 1015–1060)
- Andrew Tanca (fl. mid-11th century), Judge of Logudoro
- Andrew of Gaeta (died 1113), Duke of Gaeta
- Andrew of Rupecanina (fl. mid-12th century), Italo-Norman noble, duke of Rupecanina
- Andrew II of Hungary (c. 1177–1235)
- Andrew of Hungary, Prince of Halych (died 1233/4)
- Andrew, son of Serafin (died 1241), Hungarian baron and landowner
- Andrew III of Hungary (c. 1265–1301)
- Andrew, Duke of Slavonia (1268–1278), son of Stephen V of Hungary
- Andrew of Arborea (died 1308), Giudice of Arborea
- Andrew of Galicia (died 1323), last King of Ruthenia
- Andrew, Duke of Calabria (1327–1345), son of Charles I of Hungary
- Margrave Andrew of Burgau (1558–1600), Austrian noble and Roman Catholic cardinal
- Prince Andrew of Greece and Denmark (1882–1944), paternal grandfather and namesake of Andrew Mountbatten-Windsor
- Edward VIII of the United Kingdom (1894–1972), bore the name Andrew
- Prince Andrew Romanoff (1923–2021), Russian American artist and author; grand-nephew of Nicholas II
- Prince Andrew of Yugoslavia (1929–1990), youngest child of King Alexander I
- Andrew Mountbatten-Windsor, formerly Prince Andrew, Duke of York (born 1960), second son of Elizabeth II

== Medieval figures ==
- Andrew the Scot (died c. 877), Irish-born student and assistant of St. Donatus
- Andrew the Scythian (died after 887), Byzantine military officer in the Arab–Byzantine wars
- Andrew (bishop of Veszprém) (fl. 11th century), Hungarian prelate
- Andrew of Fleury (fl. 11th century), Christian monk and historian
- Andrew of Saint Victor (died 1175), Augustinian canon of the abbey of Saint Victor in Paris, Christian Hebraist, and biblical exegete
- Andrew (archbishop of Kalocsa) (died 1186)
- Andrew of Hungary (historian) (fl. 1270)
- Andrew of London (died c. 1278), Bishop of Winchester elect
- Andrew of Cornwall (fl. 1290s), English philosopher at Oxford
- Andrew (bishop of Győr) (died 1294/5), Hungarian bishop
- Andrew, Archbishop of Antivari (fl. early 14th century)
- Andrew de Buchan (died c. 1304), Scottish Cistercian, bishop of Caithness
- Andrew (bishop of Eger) (died 1305/6), Hungarian bishop
- Andrew of Perugia (died c. 1332), Italian Franciscan friar and bishop
- Andrew of Wyntoun (c. 1350–c. 1425), Scottish poet, canon, and prior

== Renaissance figures ==
- Andrew of Rhodes (died 1440), Greek Dominican theologian
- Andrew of Carniola (1399–1484), Roman Catholic archbishop
- Andrew of Montereale (c. 1403–1479), Italian Roman Catholic priest and member of the Order of Saint Augustine
- Master Andrew of Bristol (d. 1521), the sole Englishman in the Magellan Expedition
- Andrew of Phu Yen (1624–1644), known as the "Protomartyr of Vietnam"
- Andrew of Totma (fl. 17th century), Russian Orthodox Church religious figure

== Others ==
=== A ===
- Andrew Aanenson, American politician and farmer
- Andrew Abercromby, Scottish biomedical engineer and aquanaut
- Andrew Abdo, CEO of the Australian NRL
- Andrew Armstrong (disambiguation), multiple people
- AJ August (born 2005), American cyclist

=== B ===
- Andrew Bagby (1973–2001), Canadian murder victim
- Andrew Bailey (disambiguation), multiple people
- Andrew Barnett (born 1968), director of the UK Branch of the Calouste Gulbenkian Foundation
- Andrew Bashaija, Ugandan lawyer
- Andrew Batterley (born 1976), English cricketer
- Andrew Bayer, American DJ and Grammy-nominated record producer
- Andrew Bayes, American football player
- Andrew Beck (American football) (born 1996), American football player
- Andrew "A.J." Befumo (born 1976), American social media personality known for his role in the "Costco Guys"
- Andrew Bellatti, American baseball player
- Andrew Benintendi, American baseball player
- Andrew Bird, American musician
- Andrew Biro (born 1969), Canadian political theorist
- Andrew Bloom (born 1973), American Olympic shot putter
- Andrew Bogut, Australian basketball player
- Andrew Boland (born 1972), Irish slalom canoer
- Andrew Brereton (1827–1885), Welsh writer
- Andrew Briggs, British scientist
- Andrew Brokos (born 1982), professional poker player, instructor, author and coach
- Andrew Brown (disambiguation), multiple people
- Andrew Bruck, American lawyer and politician
- Andrew Brunette, Canadian ice hockey player
- Andrew Buckley (field hockey), New Zealand field hockey player
- Andrew Bynum, American basketball player

=== C ===
- Andrew Cain (boxer) (born 1996), English professional boxer
- Andrew Campbell (outfielder), Australian baseball player
- Andrew Carnegie, American steel magnate and philanthropist
- Andrew Chafin, American baseball player
- Andrew Chamblee (born 2004), American football player
- Andrew Clarke (disambiguation), multiple people
- Andrew Dice Clay, American comedian and actor
- Andrew Clayton, British swimmer
- Andrew Coker (born 2001), American football player
- Andrew Colvin, Australian policeman and commissioner
- Andrew Meintjes Conroy (1877–1951), South African politician
- Andrew Cossetti (born 2000), American baseball player
- Andrew Cowan (disambiguation), multiple people
- Andrew Craig, American mixed martial arts fighter
- Andrew Crichton (1910–1995), British shipping industrialist
- Andrew Cunanan (1969–1997), Filipino-American serial killer
- Andrew Cuomo, 56th Governor of New York
- Andrew Curnew, Canadian social entrepreneur

=== D ===
- Andrew Davenport (born 1965), English actor, puppeteer, voice actor, music composer
- Andrew Davidson (disambiguation), multiple people
- Andrew Davies (disambiguation), multiple people
- Andrew Davis (disambiguation), multiple people
- Andrew Dawson (record producer), American music producer, engineer, mixer and songwriter
- Andrew Demeter, American political activist, filmmaker and journalist
- Andrew De Silva (born 1974), Sri Lankan Australian rock vocalist
- Andrew Digby, British-born astronomer and bird ecologist working in New Zealand
- Andrew Dost, American musician and singer
- Andrew Jackson Donelson, American diplomat, nephew of Andrew Jackson
- Andrew Drummond (author) (born 1952), Scottish writer, translator and novelist
- Andrew Dunn (disambiguation), multiple people

=== E ===
- Andrew Ford Espiritu, Filipino hip hop artist, actor, TV host, known professionally as Andrew E.
- Andrew Essex, American business executive and author

=== F ===
- Andrew J. Feustel, American astronaut
- Andrew Flintoff, English cricketer and TV personality
- Andrew Rube Foster, Hall of Fame manager for baseball's Negro leagues
- Andrew Friedman, American, baseball general manager
- Andrew Fletcher (musician), English musician and member of English band Depeche Mode

=== G ===
- Andrew Garfield, American-British actor
- Andrew Gaze, Australian basketball player
- Andrew Gentry (born 2001), American football player
- Andrew Giuliani (born 1986), American Special Assistant to the President for President Trump
- Andrew Gillum, 125th Mayor of Tallahassee, Florida
- Andrew Gold (1951–2011), American musician
- Andrew Graham (disambiguation), multiple people
- Andrew Graham-Dixon, British art historian and broadcaster
- Andrew Gregory (disambiguation), multiple people
- Andrew Grove, American businessman/engineer/author and a science pioneer
- Andrew Guinand (1912–1987), Australian mathematician

=== H ===
- Andrew Harris (disambiguation), multiple people
- Andrew Harrison (disambiguation), multiple people
- Andrew Hastie, Australian politician
- Andrew Hastie (field hockey), New Zealand field hockey player
- Andrew Heafitz, American inventor
- Andrew Heaney (born 1991), American baseball player
- Andrew Hoffman (born 2000), American baseball player
- Andrew Holness (born 1972), Jamaican politician and current prime minister of Jamaica
- Andrew Horowitz (born 1983), American songwriter, producer, and recording artist
- Andrew Hozier-Byrne, Irish singer-songwriter
- Andrew H. Hudspeth (1874–1948), associate justice and chief justice of the New Mexico Supreme Court
- Andrew Hussie, artist at MS Paint Adventures
- Andrew Huxley (1917–2012), English physiologist and biophysicist
- Andrew Hysell (born 1971), American lawyer

=== I ===
- Andrew Ibrahim (born 1989), British terrorist
- Andrew Ikefe (born 1998), Nigerian footballer
- Andrew Ilie (born 1976), Australian tennis player
- Andrew Imbrie (1921–2007), American composer
- Andrew T. F. Ing (1920–1999), American politician
- Andrew Ingersoll (born 1940), American astronomer
- Andrew Ingraham (1841–1905), American headmaster
- Andrew B. Ingram (1851–1934), Canadian politician
- Andrew Innes (born 1962), Scottish musician
- Andrew Innes (cricketer) (1905–1968), Scottish cricketer
- Andrew Intamba (1947–2014), Namibian politician and diplomat
- Andrew Intrater, American businessman
- Andrew P. Iosue (1927–2026), United States Air Force general
- Andrew Ireland (footballer) (born 1953), Australian rules footballer and administrator
- Andrew Ireland (rower) (born 1982), Canadian rower
- Andrew Ireland (politician) (born 1995), American politician
- Andrew Irvine (mountaineer) (1902–1924), British mountaineer
- Andrew Irvine (bassist) (born 1969), American bassist
- Andrew David Irvine (born 1958), Canadian academic
- Andrew Scott Irving (1837–1904), Canadian bookseller and publisher
- William Andrew Irwin (1884–1967), Canadian educator
- Andrew C. Isenberg (born 1964), American historian
- Andrew Ives, British automotive engineer
- Andrew Conway Ivy (1893–1978), American physician
- Andrew N. Iwaniuk (born 1974), Canadian biologist

=== J ===
- Andrew Jackson, American general and politician, 7th President of the United States of America
- Andrew Jackson Sr., father of Andrew Jackson
- Andrew Jacobs (disambiguation), multiple people
- Andrew Jacobson, Major League Soccer player
- Andrew Jayamanne, Sri Lankan film director
- Andrew Jenike, American engineer and company president of Jenike & Johanson, Inc.
- Andrew Jenkins (songwriter) (1885–1957), American country, folk and gospel songs composer
- Andrew Johns, Australian rugby league player and broadcaster
- Andrew Johnson (disambiguation), multiple people, including:
  - Andrew Johnson, 17th President of the United States of America
- Andrew Johnston (disambiguation), multiple people

=== K ===
- Andrew Kamarck (died 2010), American economist
- Andrew Keegan, American actor
- Andrew Kennedy (disambiguation), multiple people
- Andrew Kittredge, American baseball player
- Andrew Knapp, American baseball player
- Andrew Knizner, American baseball player
- Andrew Knott, English actor
- Andrew Kumarage, 3rd Anglican Bishop of Kurunegala

=== L ===
- Andrew Ladd, Canadian ice hockey player
- Andrew Laine, American engineer
- Andrew Lang (1844–1912), Scottish poet, novelist and literary critic
- Andrew Lanham, American film screenwriter
- Andrew-Lee Potts, English actor/director
- Andrej Lemanis, Australian basketball coach
- Andrew Lewis (racing driver) (born 1987), American racing driver
- Andrew Lincoln, British actor
- Andrew Lloyd Webber, English composer and impresario
- Andrew Lorraine, American baseball player
- Andrew Luck, American football player
- Andrew Luri, Sudanese-Australian actor

=== M ===
- Andrew Wanamilil Malibirr (born 1980), Aboriginal Australian artist
- Andrew Mallalieu, Barbadian politician
- Andrej Mangold, German basketball player
- Andrew Marr, British broadcaster
- Andrew Marvell (1621–1678), English Metaphysical poet, satirist and politician
- Andrew McCarthy, American actor, director and travel writer
- Andrew McCullough, Australian Rugby League player
- Andrew McCutchen, American baseball player
- Andrew Mehrtens, New Zealand rugby union player
- Andrew Mellon, American businessman, philanthropist and politician
- Andrew Melontree (born 1957), American football player
- Andrew Mercier, Canadian politician
- Andrew Mercer (disambiguation), multiple people
- Andrew Meyer (born 2000), American football player
- Andrew Micallef, Maltese painter and musician
- Andrew Miller (disambiguation), multiple people
- Andrew Mlangeni, South African politician
- Andrew Monteiro (born 1992), Brazilian footballer
- Andrew Mroczek (born 1977), American artist and curator
- Andrew Myers (racing driver) (born 1980), American racing driver

=== N ===
- Andrew Nabbout, Australian association football player
- Andrew Nardi, American baseball player
- Andrew Neil, Scottish political journalist and broadcaster

=== O ===
- Andrew O'Keefe, Australian TV personality
- Andrew Oates (born 1969), Australian and British biologist
- Andrew Ott, American engineer
- Andrew Oye (born 1974), Canadian composer

=== P ===
- Andrew Padilla, American singer
- Andrew Painter (disambiguation), multiple people
- Andrew Clennel Palmer, British engineer
- Andrew Peasley (born 2000), American football player
- Andrew David Perkins (born 1978), American music educator
- Andrew Pinckney (born 2000), American baseball player
- Andrew Provence (born 1961), American football player

=== Q ===
- Andrew Qappik (born 1964), Canadian Inuk graphic artist
- William Andrew Quarles (1825–1893), American politician
- Andrew Quarless (born 1988), American football player
- Andrew Quattrin (born 1996), Canadian rugby union player
- Andrew Querbes (1864–1939), American banker and politician
- Andrew Quick (MP) (1666–1736), British Member of Parliament
- Andrew Quigley (1860s–1937), Northern Irish politician
- Andrew P. Quigley (1926–1990), American politician and newspaper publisher
- Andrew Quilty (born 1981), Australian photojournalist
- Andrew Quinn (hurler) (born 1983), Irish hurler
- Andrew Quinn (footballer) (born 2002), Irish footballer
- Joseph Andrew Quinn (1886–1939), American lawyer
- Andrew Quintero (1963–2014), American scientist
- Andrew Quitmeyer (born 1986), American teacher

=== R ===
- Andrew Rader, Canadian author and aerospace engineer
- Andrew Rannells, American actor
- Andrew S. Rappaport (born 1957), American businessperson, philanthropist
- Andrew Rappleyea (born 2004), American football player
- Andrew Raycroft, Canadian ice hockey player
- Andrew Raym (born 2001), American football player
- Andrew Rea (born 1987), American YouTuber, cook, author
- Andrew Ridgeley, English musician, George Michael's partner in Wham!
- Andrew Bonney Robbins, American entrepreneur, civil war veteran, real estate developer
- Andrew Robertson, Scottish footballer
- Andrew Robinson (disambiguation), multiple people
- Andrew J. Roger, Canadian-Australian molecular biologist
- Andrew Rolin (born 1987), American former college football player and coach
- Andrew Rotilio, Canadian actor
- Andrew Rowell (born 1982), British filmmaker
- Andrew Rozdilsky Jr., American clown
- Andrew Rushbury (born 1983), English footballer

=== S ===
- Andrew Sabiston, Canadian voice actor
- Andrew Sachs (1930–2016), British character actor
- Andrew Salgado (born 1982), Canadian artist
- Andrew Schulz, American comedian
- Andrew Scott (actor) (born 1976), Irish actor
- Andrew Sega, American musician
- Andrew "Drew" Shelton (born 2003), American football player
- Andrew "Andy" Shernoff, songwriter/guitarist for the pre-punk band The Dictators
- Andrew Shue, American actor
- Andrew Simms, British environmentalist and political economist
- Andrew Simoncelli, American educator
- Andrew Skeet, musical artist
- Andrew Slattery, Irish rally car driver
- Andrew Smith (basketball, born 1992), American/Latvian player
- Andrew Stahl (born 1952), American television and film actor
- Andrew Sprague (born 2005), American football player
- Andrew Stanton, American animator, storyboard artist, film director, and screenwriter
- Andrew Stevovich, American visual artist
- Andrew Still (actor) (born 1993), Scottish actor
- Andrew Stockdale, guitarist and singer of Wolfmother
- Andrew Swafford, American politician
- Andrew Symonds (1975–2022), Australian cricketer
- Andrew Sznajder (born 1967), English-born Canadian tennis player

=== T ===
- Andrew Tan (born 1952), Chinese-Filipino billionaire and business magnate
- Andrew S. Tanenbaum, American-Dutch computer scientist
- Andrew Tate, British-American martial artist, businessman, and media personality
- Andrew Thaler, Australian local politician
- Andrew Thompson (disambiguation), multiple people
- Andrew Tiller (born 1989), American football player
- Andrew Timlin, New Zealand field hockey player
- Andrew Toles, American baseball player
- Andrew Toney, American basketball player
- Andrew Torgashev (born 2001), American figure skater

=== U ===
- Andrew Uchendu, Nigerian politician
- Andrew Ukovic (born 1978), Australian rules footballer
- Andrew Ullmann (born 1963), German politician
- Andrew Umeed (born 1996), Scottish cricketer
- Andrew Unangst, American photographer
- Andrew Underwood (born 1967), Australian rules footballer
- Andrew Unger (born 1979), Canadian writer
- Andrew Mitchell Uniacke (1808–1895), Nova Scotian politician
- Andrew E. Unsworth, American organist
- Andrew Upson (1825–1864), American politician
- Andrew Upton (born 1966), Australian screenwriter
- Andrew Urdiales (1964–2018), American serial killer
- Andrew Ure (1778–1857), Scottish doctor and chemist
- Andrew David Urshan (1884–1967), Assyrian evangelist
- Andrew Usher (1826–1898), Scottish whisky distiller and blender
- Andrew Utting (born 1977), Australian baseball players
- Andrew Uwe (born 1967), Nigerian footballer
- Andrew Edobor Uzamere (born 1962), Nigerian politician

=== V ===
- Andrew Van Ginkel (born 1997), American football player
- Andrew VanWyngarden, American musician
- Andrew Vasquez, Native American flute player
- Andrew Vasquez (baseball), American baseball player
- Andrew Vaughn (born 1998), American baseball player
- Andrew Velazquez (born 1994), American baseball player
- Andrew Vollert (born 1995), American football player
- Andrew Vorhees (born 1999), American football player

=== W ===
- Andrew W.K., American singer-songwriter, multi-instrumentalist, entertainer, and motivational speaker
- Andrew Wade, American sound engineer and producer
- Andrew Wagner, American film director
- Andrew Wakefield, British anti-vaccine activist
- Andrew Walcott (born 1975), former English and GB sprinter
- Andrew Walter, American football player
- Andrew Wantz, American baseball player
- Andrew Watson (disambiguation), multiple people
- Andrew West (disambiguation), multiple people
- Andrew Wiggins, Canadian basketball player
- Andrew Wiles, British mathematician, proved Fermat's Last Theorem
- Andrew Wilson (swimmer), American swimmer
- Andrew Wingard (born 1996), American football player
- Andrew Wood (disambiguation), multiple people
- Andrew Wyeth, American visual artist

=== Y ===
- Andrew Yang, American entrepreneur, philanthropist, lawyer, and 2020 presidential candidate

=== Z ===
- Andrew Zock (born 2005), American football player
- Andrew Zydney (born 1958(?)), American chemical engineer

== Fictional characters ==
- Andrei Nikolayevich Bolkonsky, in Leo Tolstoy's novel War and Peace
- Andy Botwin from the TV series Weeds
- Andy Bernard, from the U.S. TV series The Office
- Andy Dwyer, from the TV series Parks and Recreation
- Andrew Ryan (BioShock), from the video game BioShock
- Andrew Prior, in Veronica Roth's Divergent
- Andrew Wiggin from Orson Scott Card's novel Ender's Game

== See also ==
- Andy (given name)
- Drew (name)
