= Andrew Johnson (disambiguation) =

Andrew Johnson (1808–1875) was the 17th president of the United States from 1865 to 1869.

Andrew Johnson or Andy Johnson may also refer to:

== Art ==
- Andy Dog Johnson (1959–2016), English artist and illustrator
- Andy Johnson (artist) (1893–1971), Swedish-American painter

== Politics ==
- Andy Johnson (politician) (born 1953), Florida state representative, 1979–1982
- Andrew Johnson (Michigan politician) (1889–?), member of the Michigan House of Representatives
- Andrew Johnson (Minnesota politician) (born 1983 or 1984), Minneapolis city councilmember
- A. R. Johnson (1856–1933), Louisiana politician

== Sports ==
- Andrew Johnson (footballer, born 1981), English footballer
- Andrew Johnson (golfer) (born 1972), American professional golfer
- Andrew Johnson (rugby league), rugby league footballer of the 1960s
- Andrew Johnson (skier) (fl. 2000s), American cross-country skier
- Andy Johnson (American football) (1952–2018), American football player
- Andy Johnson (basketball) (1932–2002), American basketball player
- Andy Johnson (cricketer) (born 1964), former English cricketer
- Andy Johnson (footballer, born 1974), Wales international footballer born in England
- Andy Johnson (rugby league) (born 1974), former London Broncos rugby league player

== Other people ==
- Andrew Johnson (soldier) (1833–1912), American Civil War Medal of Honor recipient
- Andrew Johnson (architect) (1844–1921), American architect
- Andrew Stuart Johnson (1848–1926), farmer, lumber merchant, mining company owner and political figure in Quebec
- Andrew N. Johnson (1876–1959), Methodist minister
- Andrew Johnson Jr. (1852–1878), son of the U.S. president

== Other uses ==
- USRC Andrew Johnson, various revenue cutters
- Andy Johnson (Squirrel Boy)

== See also ==
- Drew Johnson (disambiguation)
- Andrew Johnston (disambiguation)
