= Andrew Mercer =

Andrew Mercer may refer to:

- Andrew Mercer (cricketer) (born 1979), English cricketer
- Andrew Mercer (poet) (1775–1842), Scottish poet
- Andrew Egyapa Mercer (born 1973), Ghanaian politician and lawyer
- Andrew Mercer (mayor), New Zealand politician
- Andrew Mercer (politician) (1859–1927), New Zealand-born British politician

== See also ==
- Andrew Mercer Reformatory for Women, former prison and treatment facility for women in Toronto, Canada.
