= Maderna =

Maderna is a surname. Notable people with the surname include:

- Bruno Maderna (1920–1973), Italian conductor and composer
- Carlos Maderna (1910–1976), Argentine chess master
- Divya Maderna (born 1984), Indian politician
- Ezequiel Maderna (born 1986), Argentine boxer
- Giovanni Maderna (born 1973), Italian film director
- Mahipal Maderna (born 1952), Indian politician
- Marianne Maderna (born 1944), Austrian installation artist
- Parasram Maderna (1926–2014), Indian politician
