= Vinod Kulkarni =

Indian voice actor

- Education: Industrial Electronics Engineer
- Occupations: Actor voice artist
- Years active: 1984–Current

Vinod Kulkarni (Vinōda Kulakarṇī) is an Indian actor, director, voicing artiste and voice co-ordinator, who specialises in dubbing International productions into the Hindi language. He can speak English, Hindi and Marathi. He has voiced over 20,000 commercials. His son Sahil Kulkarni is also voice actor.

== Career ==
Kulkarni is an actor of Hindi and Marathi stage, films and serials, as well.

He is a voicing artist for films from Hollywood, Bollywood, Korean, Japanese, Chinese & South-Indian Industries, and web series on different platforms, such as Netflix, Disney+ Hotstar, Amazon, and Voot. He has rendered his voice for 20,000+ commercials, Documentaries, AVs on all mediums like TV, Radio, Theatre & Digital in around 45 languages.

Kulkarni started his career in 1986, when he dubbed for International productions such as Popeye. At the time, there were few contenders for such work and recognition came far easier. "We were all stars then," he recalls. "But unlike me, others would feel awkward when asked to audition for voices or imitate animals. So not many came forward," he said. He also mostly dubbed for Telugu comic actor Brahmanandam in Hindi.

== Filmography ==
=== Live action films ===
Year	Film title	Role	Language(s)	Note
1976	Kalicharan	Comedian	Hindi	
1994	Vazir	Journalist Vichare	Marathi	
1998	Purani Qabar	Pahalaram, Doojaram, Teejaram	Hindi	
1998	Main Phir Aaoongi	Inspector	Hindi	
1999	Split Wide Open	Gangster 1	Hindi, English	
	Sanyasi mera naam	Pandit	Hindi	
2000	Aaj Ka Ravan	Subhash	Hindi	
2000	Billa No 786	Tukaram	Hindi	
2001	Ramgarh ki Ramkali	Villain	Hindi	
2001	Jungle Hero	Jyotshi	Hindi	
2003	Sabse badi Ganga ki Saugandh	Constable Badbola	Hindi	
2004	Navara Maaza Navasacha	Inspector	Marathi	
2010	Ideachi Kalpana	Watchman	Marathi	Cameo
2010	Lafangey Parindey	Inspector Pawar	Hindi	
2010	Toonpur Ka Superrhero	Professor Homi, Putch, Ostrich, Rubdoot	Hindi	Voice Role in live-action film
2014	Guru Pournima	Bank Manager	Marathi	
2017	Meri Pyari Bindu	Bathroom Man	Hindi	

=== Animated series ===
Airdate	Program title	Role	Language	Episodes	Channel	Notes
2010–present	Roll No 21	Kans	Hindi		Cartoon Network	
2009	Little Krishna	Aghasura	Hindi	13	Nickelodeon India	
2017	Baahubali: The Lost Legends	Pradhan Guru	Hindi; English	13	Amazon Prime Video	
2018 present	Rudra: Boom Chik Chik Boom	Shakaal	Hindi		Nickelodeon India	

=== Animated films ===
Year	Film title	Role	Language(s)	Notes
2007	Return of Hanuman	Scientish Jwalamukhi	Hindi	
2012	Krishna Aur Kans	Trinavert	Hindi	
2018	Rudra: Dawn of The Dangerous Dongreela.	Shakal	Hindi	
2019	Rudra: The Magical Painting.	Shakal	Hindi	
2020	Rudra: Trapped in Mirror World.	Shakal	Hindi	
2020	Rudra: School Admission Conspiracy.	Shakal	Hindi	

== Dubbing roles ==
=== Live action television series ===
Title	Actor	Role	Dub language	Original language	Episodes	Original airdate	Dubbed airdate	Notes
Pawn Stars	Richard Benjamin "The Old Man" Harrison	Himself	Hindi	English				
Duck Dynasty	Phil Robertson	Himself	Hindi	English	68	3/21/2012-Current	2013-current	
Goosebumps	Annick Obonsawin Cal Dodd	Slappy the Dummy (voice)	Hindi	English	74	10/27/1995- 11/16/1998	5/15/2006-2009	Aired on Jetix India which is now known as Disney XD India.
Sacred Games	Nawazuddin Siddiqui	Ganesh Gaitonde	English	Hindi	16			
Titans	Reed Birney	Dr. Adamson	Hindi	English		2018-Current	2019-current	
Lucifer	Patrick Fabian	Reese Getty	Hindi	English		25/1/2016– present		
Spider-Noir	Andrew Robinson	Ogden Faber	Hindi	English	3	28/5/2026	28/5/2026	Streaming on Prime Video.

=== Animated series ===
Program title	Original voice(s)	Character(s)	Dub language	Original language	Number of episodes	Original airdate	Dubbed airdate	Notes
DuckTales	Beck Bennett	Launchpad McQuack	Hindi	English	24	2017–present	2018–present	
The Sylvester & Tweety Mysteries	Joe Alaskey	Sylvester the Cat	Hindi	English	52	9/9/1995-12/18/2002		
The Powerpuff Girls	Tom Kane Chuck McCann Tom Kenny	Professor Utonium Bossman Mayor	Hindi	English	78	11/18/1998- 3/25/2005	2000-2005	Vinod voiced three characters in the Hindi dub. Aired on Cartoon Network India.
Courage the Cowardly Dog	Howard Hoffman (pilot); Marty Grabstein (series)	Narrator	Hindi	English	52	11/12/1999-11/22/2002	2000-2003	
Ed Edd n Eddy	Tony Sampson	Eddy	Hindi	English	130	4/11/1999-11/8/2009	2001-2009	Aired on Cartoon Network India
Batman: The Animated Series	Mark Hamill	Joker	Hindi	English	95	9/5/1992- 9/15/1995	9/9/2000- 7/8/2005	Aired on Cartoon Network India much later after the original airing. Season 1(65 episodes) is streaming on Prime Video.
CatDog	Jim Cummings	Cat	Hindi	English	68	4/4/1998- 6/15/2005	Unknown	
SpongeBob SquarePants	Mr. Lawrence	Plankton	Hindi	English	194	5/1/1999-Current	Unknown	
Dragon Tales	Eli Gabay	Quetzal	Hindi	English	96	9/6/1999-11/25/2005	2005	Aired on Cartoon Network India.
Jungle Book Shōnen Mowgli	Masaru Ikeda	Alexander / Sikandar	Hindi	Japanese	52	10/2/1989–10 October 1990	1993–1994	The Hindi dub title of the series was just called: "The Jungle Book" and the name "Alexander" was known as "Sikandar" (or "Sikander" as the alternative spelling). It has aired on Doordarshan and on DD National.
Batman: Caped Crusader	Dan Donohue	Basil Karlo / Clayface	Hindi	English	10 (dubbed 1)	August 1, 2024	August 1, 2024	Episode: "...And Be a Villain". Season 1 is airing on Amazon Prime Video

=== Live action films ===
==== Hollywood films ====
Film title	Actor(s)	Character(s)	Dub language	Original language	Original Year release	Dub Year release	Notes
Jaws	Roy Scheider	Chief Martin Brody	Hindi	English	1975	Unknown	
Space Jam	Bill Farmer	Sylvester the Cat (voice)	Hindi	English	1996	Unknown	Live Action/Animated hybrid film.
Stuart Little	Nathan Lane	Snowbell (voice)	Hindi	English	1999	1999	
Stuart Little 2	Nathan Lane	Snowbell (voice)	Hindi	English	2002	2002	
Daredevil	Ben Affleck	Matt Murdock / Daredevil	Hindi	English	2003	2003	
Planet of the Apes	Tim Roth	General Thade	Hindi	English	2001	2001	
Harry Potter and the Chamber of Secrets	Toby Jones	Dobby (voice)	Hindi	English	2002	2003	
Harry Potter and the Deathly Hallows – Part 1	Toby Jones	Dobby (voice)	Hindi	English	2010	2010	
The Chronicles of Narnia: Prince Caspian	Ken Stott	Trufflehunter (voice)	Hindi	English	2008	2008	Vinod's name was mentioned on the Hindi dub credits of the DVD release of the film.
2012	Woody Harrelson	Charlie Frost	Hindi	English	2010	2010	
Robocop	Patrick Garrow	Antonie Wallon	Hindi	English	2014	2014	
Inception	Michael Caine	Professor Stephen Miles	Hindi	English	2010	2013	
The Mask of Zorro	Anthony Hopkins	Diego De; La Vega	Hindi	English	1998		Aired by UTV Action.
The Last Samurai	Timothy Spall	Simon Graham	Hindi	English	2003	2003	
Mission: Impossible – Rogue Nation	Simon McBurney	Attlee	Hindi	English	2015	2015	
Batman	Jack Nicholson	Jack; Napier / The Joker	Hindi	English	1989		Aired by UTV Action.
Batman Forever	Jim Carrey	Edward Nygma / The Riddler	Hindi	English	1995	1995	
Goosebumps	Jack Black	Slappy the Dummy (voice)	Hindi	English	2015	2015	
The Legend of Hercules	Scott Adkins	King Amphitryon	Hindi	English	2014	2014	
Spider-Man	Bruce Campbell	Ring Announcer (cameo)	Hindi	English	2002	2002	
Avengers: Infinity War	Tom Vaughan-Lawlor	Ebony Maw	Hindi	English	2018	2018	
Jojo Rabbit	Taika Waititi	Adolf Hitler	Hindi	English	2019	2019	
Flubber	Robin Williams	Professor Philip Brainard	Hindi	English	1997		

==== South Indian films ====
Film title	Actor(s)	Character(s)	Dub language	Original language	Original Year release	Dub Year release	Notes
King	Brahmanandam	Jayasurya	Hindi	Telugu	2008	2010	The Hindi dub was titled: King No. 1.
Pokiri	Brahmanandam	Software Engineer Brahmi	Hindi	Telugu	2006	2010	The Hindi dub was titled: Tapori Wanted.
Arya 2	Brahmanandam	Dasavatharam	Hindi	Telugu	2009	2010	The Hindi dub was titled: Arya: Ek Deewana.
Kedi	Sayaji Shinde	Mumbai Police Commissioner Shekhar Ranawat Shinde	Hindi	Telugu	2010	2011	The Hindi dub was titled: Gambler No. 1.
Khatarnak	Ali	Sathi Pandu (Shaana Pandu in Hindi version)	Hindi	Telugu	2006	2012	The Hindi dub was titled: Main Hoon Khatarnak.
Baadshah	Brahmanandam	Padmanabha Simha (Prem Pratap in Hindi version)	Hindi	Telugu	2013	2013	The Hindi dub was titled: Rowdy Baadshah.
Balupu	Brahmanandam	Crazy Mohan (Steve Yadav in Hindi version)	Hindi	Telugu	2013	2014	The Hindi dub was titled: Jani Dushman.
Racha	Brahmanandam	Dr. Rangeela	Hindi	Telugu	2012	2014	The Hindi dub was titled: Betting Raja.
Rebel	Brahmanandam	Narasa Raju (Birju in Hindi version)	Hindi	Telugu	2012	2014	The Hindi dub was titled: The Return Of Rebel.
Naayak	Brahmanandam	Jilebi	Hindi	Telugu	2013	2014	The Hindi dub was titled: Double Attack.
Krishnam Vande Jagadgurum	Brahmanandam	Rampam (Rangasthala Pandit)	Hindi	Telugu	2012	2014	The Hindi dub was titled: Krishna Ka Badla.
Power	Brahmanandam	Animutyam	Hindi	Telugu	2014	2014	The Hindi dub was titled: Power Unlimited.
Denikaina Ready	Brahmanandam	Bangaraju	Hindi	Telugu	2012	2015	The Hindi dub was titled: Sabse Badi Hera Pheri 2.
Mirchi	Brahmanandam	Veera Pratap	Hindi	Telugu	2013	2015	The Hindi dub was titled: Khatarnak Khiladi.
Yevadu	Brahmanandam	Satya's illegal tenant	Hindi	Telugu	2014	2015	
Kandireega	Brahmanandam	Special appearance	Hindi	Telugu	2011	2015	The Hindi dub was titled: Dangerous Khiladi 4.
Rabhasa	Brahmanandam	Raju	Hindi	Telugu	2014	2015	The Hindi dub was titled: The Super Khiladi 2.
Happy	Brahmanandam	Appala Naidu (Gaurav Naidu in Hindi version)	Hindi	Telugu	2006	2015	The Hindi dub was titled: Dum.
Cameraman Gangatho Rambabu	Brahmanandam	Bobby	Hindi	Telugu	2012	2016	The Hindi dub was titled: Mera Target.
Endukante... Premanta!	Brahmanandam	Pandu Ranga Rao	Hindi	Telugu	2012	2016	The Hindi dub was titled: Dangerous Khiladi 5.
Heart Attack	Brahmanandam	ISKCON Ramana	Hindi	Telugu	2014	2016	
Anjaan	Brahmanandam	Guru Shastri	Hindi	Tamil	2014	2016	The Hindi dub was titled: Khatarnak Khiladi 2.
Son of Satyamurthy	Brahmanandam	Koda Rambabu (Sunil Shastri aka Baburao in Hindi version)	Hindi	Telugu	2015	2016	
Sudigadu	Brahmanandam	Jaffa Reddy (Kanchana Reddy in Hindi version) / CBI officer Jaffa Rai	Hindi	Telugu	2012	2016	The Hindi dub was titled: Hero No. Zero.
Akhil: The Power Of Jua	Brahmanandam	Johnson and Johnson	Hindi	Telugu	2015	2017	
Sarrainodu	Brahmanandam	Linga Hariharan	Hindi	Telugu	2016	2017	
Theri	Rajendran	P. Rajendran	Hindi	Tamil	2016	2017	
Janatha Garage	Sachin Khedekar	Mukesh	Hindi	Telugu	2016	2017	The Hindi dub was titled: Janta Garage.
Doosukeltha	Brahmanandam	Veera Brahmam	Hindi	Telugu	2013	2017	The Hindi dub was titled: Dangerous Khiladi 6.
Pandavulu Pandavulu Tummeda	Brahmanandam	Pichakuntla Paidithalli (Rabindranath Ludhianvi in Hindi version) (Bapure)	Hindi	Telugu	2014	2017	The Hindi dub was titled: Sabse Badi Hera Pheri 3.
Saagasam	M. S. Bhaskar	Sadanandam	Hindi	Tamil	2016	2017	The Hindi dub was titled: Jeene Nahi Doonga 2.
Nenu Local	Sachin Khedekar	Satyanarayana Murthy	Hindi	Telugu	2017	2018	The Hindi dub was titled: Super Khiladi 4.
Gopala Gopala	Mithun Chakraborty (voice in original version dubbed by P. Ravi Shankar)	Leeladhara Swamy	Hindi	Telugu	2015	2018	
Dora	Thambi Ramaiah	Vairakannu (Vivek Khanna in Hindi version)	Hindi	Tamil	2017	2018	The Hindi dub was titled: Kanchana: The Wonder Car.
Sketch	Jeeva Ravi	Police Officer	Hindi	Tamil	2018	2018	
Agnyaathavaasi	Boman Irani (voice in original version dubbed by P. Ravi Shankar)	Govind Bhargav Vinda	Hindi	Telugu	2018	2018	The Hindi dub was titled: Yevadu 3.
Achari America Yatra	Brahmanandam	Appalacharya	Hindi	Telugu	2018	2019	The Hindi dub was titled: Thugs Of America.
3	Prabhu	Ram's father	Hindi	Tamil	2012	2020	
Malligadu Marriage Bureau	Brahmanandam	Chotu Bhai	Hindi	Telugu	2014	2020	The Hindi dub was titled: Marriage Bureau.
Soorarai Pottru	Paresh Rawal	Paresh Goswami	Hindi	Tamil	2020	2021	The Hindi dub was titled: Udaan.
Ala Vaikunthapurramuloo	Sachin Khedekar (voice in original version dubbed by Subhalekha Sudhakar)	Ananth Ramakrishna ARK	Hindi	Telugu	2020	2022	

=== Animated films ===
Film title	Original voice	Character	Dub language	Original language	Original Year Release	Dub Year Release	Note
Beauty and the Beast	Rex Everhart	Maurice	Hindi	English	1991	2009	Aired on Television.
Cars	Larry the Cable Guy	Mater	Hindi	English	2006	2006	
Cars 2	Larry the Cable Guy	Mater	Hindi	English	2011	2011	
Cars 3	Larry the Cable Guy	Mater	Hindi	English	2017	2017	
Kung Fu Panda	Dustin Hoffman	Master Shifu	Hindi	English	2008	2008	
Kung Fu Panda 2	Dustin Hoffman	Master Shifu	Hindi	English	2011	2011	
Kung Fu Panda 3	Dustin Hoffman	Master Shifu	Hindi	English	2016	2016	
The Boss Baby	Steve Buscemi	Francis E. Francis	Hindi	English	2017	2017	
Batman: Mask of the Phantasm	Mark Hamill	Joker	Hindi	English	1993	2000	Aired on Cartoon Network India on 25 November 2000.
Batman Beyond: Return of the Joker	Mark Hamill	Joker	Hindi	English	2000		
The Adventures of Tintin	Simon Pegg	Thompson	Hindi	English	2011	2011	

== See also ==
- Dubbing (filmmaking)
- List of Indian dubbing artists
