= Andrew Davies =

Andrew or Andy Davies may refer to:

== Politics ==
- Andrew Davies (Labour politician) (born 1952), Welsh Labour politician
- Andrew RT Davies (born 1968), Welsh Conservative politician

== Sports ==
- Andrew Davies (British runner) (born 1979), British long-distance runner
- Andrew Davies (Canadian runner) (born 2000), Canadian long-distance runner and competitor at the 2019 World Cross Country Championships
- Andrew Davies (cricketer, born 1976), Welsh cricketer
- Andrew Davies (cricketer, born 1962), former English cricketer
- Andrew Davies (footballer) (born 1984), English defender
- Andrew Davies (weightlifter) (born 1967), British weightlifter
- Andy Davies (referee), English football referee
- Andy Davies (footballer) (born 1978), Welsh football player and manager

== Other ==
- Andrew Davies (writer) (born 1936), Welsh author and screenwriter
- Andrew Davies (historian) (born 1962), British academic
- Andrew Davies (businessman) (born 1963), CEO designate of Carillion
- Andrew Mark Davies (born 1966), president of Wind Telecomunicazioni Spa
- Andy Davies (musician) (born 1981), Welsh jazz trumpeter
- Andy J. Davies (born 1966), British musician, songwriter, audio engineer and record producer

== See also ==
- Andrew Davis (disambiguation)
