= List of Slovenian theologians =

The following is a list of notable theologians from Slovenia:

== A ==
- Aloysius Ambrozic

== B ==
- Franc Breckerfeld

== C ==
- Andrew of Carniola

== G ==
- Christian Gostečnik
- Gabriel Gruber
- Vekoslav Grmič

== K ==
- Edvard Kovač
- Sebastijan Krelj

== M ==
- Anton Mahnič

== R ==
- Franc Rode

== S ==
- Josip Srebrnič
- Anton Stres
- Anton Strle
- Avguštin Stegenšek

== Š ==
- Alojzij Šuštar

== T ==
- Vladimir Truhlar

== U ==
- Aleš Ušeničnik
