= Andrew Davis =

Andrew or Andy Davis may refer to:

== People ==
- Andy Davis (American football) (1927–2007), American football player
- Andrew Davis (conductor) (1944–2024), British conductor
- Andrew Davis (businessman) (born 1964), founder and chairman of von Essen Hotels
- Andrew Davis (director) (born 1946), American film director
- Andrew Davis (racing driver) (born 1977), American racing driver
- Andrew Jackson Davis (1826–1910), American spiritualist
- Andrew M. Davis (born 1950), professor of astronomy and geophysics at the University of Chicago
- Andrew B. Davis (born 1985), United States district judge
- Drew Davis (American football coach) (Andrew Hilton Davis, born 1993), American college football coach

== Fictional characters ==
- Andy Davis (Toy Story), in the film Toy Story

== See also ==
- Andrew Davies (disambiguation)
