= Andrew Kamarck =

American economist (1914–2010)

Andy Kamarck

Personal details
- Born: Andrew Martin Kamarck; November 10, 1914 Newton Falls, New York, U.S.
- Died: March 10, 2010 (aged 95) Brewster, Massachusetts, U.S.
- Party: Democratic
- Education: Harvard University (BA, MA, PhD)
- Scientific career
- Fields: Economics
- Institutions: World Bank; United States Secretary of the Treasury; Paul H. Nitze School of Advanced International Studies; University of California, Los Angeles

Andrew Martin Kamarck (died 3 March 2010) was an American economist, Director of the Economic Development Institute at the World Bank and Regents Professor at University of California, Los Angeles.

In 1936, Kamarck graduated with a summa cum laude BA degree at Harvard University. In 1951, he got his Ph.D. at Harvard. He worked for the Federal Reserve Board and, during World War II, he "was posted to the Allied Control Commission for Italy, where he supervised the Banca d'Italia". In 1944, he "was assigned as Chief of the U.S. Financial Intelligence in Germany". He then continued to work for the United States Secretary of the Treasury in 1946, contributing to the policy guidelines for the Marshall Plan. He later became World Bank Economic Adviser, Professor at University of California, Los Angeles (1964–65) and Research Associate at the Harvard Center for International Affairs.

== Publications ==
- The African Economy and International Trade. Paper. In: The United States and Africa. Thirteenth American Assembly, Columbia University, Harriman, New York, May 1–4, 1958 ASIN B004V31XEO ASIN B0012NA61M
- Economic evolution of Africa. Industrial College of the Armed Forces, 1960. ASIN B0007HZ6XC
- Recent economic growth in Africa. American Academy of Political and Social Science, 1964. ASIN B0007FBIJK
- The Economics of African Development. New York: Praeger, 1967

Reviewed by Robert P. Armstrong. In: The American Economic Review, vol. 57, no. 5, 1967, p. 1339-1342.

- The Appraisal of Country Economic Performance. In: Economic Development and Cultural Change, vol. 18, no. 2, p. 153-165, 1970.
- Capital and Investment in Developing Countries. In: Finance and Development, vol. 8, p. 2, 1971.
- The Economics of African Development. Praeger, 1971. ISBN 978-0-275-28030-7
- Climate and economic development. Economic Development Institute, 1972
- Climate and economic development. Seminar paper. Economic Development Institute, International Bank for Reconstruction and Development, 1975. ASIN B00072XWDS
- The Tropics and Economic Development: A Provocative Inquiry into the Poverty of Nations. Baltimore/London: The Johns Hopkins University Press, 1976. (for the World Bank) ISBN 978-0-8018-1891-2

Reviewed by William Diebold Jr., Foreign Affairs, April 1977.
Reviewed by Mark Perlman. In: Journal of Economic Literature, vol. 16, no. 1, 1978, p. 120-123.

- The Tropics and Economic Development. The Johns Hopkins University Press, 1979. ASIN B000SZR5ZK
- With William D. Clark. McNamara's Bank. In: Foreign Affairs, vol. 60, no. 4, 1982, p. 951-953.
- The Resources of Tropical Africa. In: Daedalus, vol. 111, no. 2 (Black Africa: A Generation after Independence.), 1982, p. 149-163.
- Economics and the Real World. Philadelphia: University of Pennsylvania Press, 1983. ISBN 978-0-8122-7902-3

Reviewed by E. Scott Maynes. In: Journal of Economic Literature, vol. 23, no. 4, 1985, p. 1786-1788.
Reviewed by Paul Streeten. In: Economic Development and Cultural Change, vol. 34, no. 1, 1985, p. 173-176.

- Slow Growth in Africa. In: The Journal of Economic Perspectives, vol. 14, no. 2, 2000, p. 235-237.
- Economics for the Twenty-First Century: The Economics of the Economist-Fox. Ashgate Publishing, 2001. ISBN 978-0-7546-1717-4
- Economics as a Social Science: An Approach to Nonautistic Theory. University of Michigan Press, 2002. ISBN 978-0-472-11243-2

Economics as a Social Science: An Approach to Nonautistic Theory. Book description at The University of Michigan Press.
Reviewed by Esther-Mirjam Sent. In: The Review of Politics, 66, p. 350-352, 2004. doi:10.1017/S0034670500037463

- The Debt Crisis in Africa. In: Journal of Economic Issues, v 28, n. 4, p. 1294(4)

== See also ==
- Geography and wealth
