= St George (London County Council constituency) =

London County Council constituency

- Former constituency for the London County Council

Former constituency
- Created: 1889
- Abolished: 1919
- Member(s): 2
- Replaced by: Whitechapel and St George's

St George, also known as St George's-in-the-East, was a constituency used for elections to the London County Council between 1889 and 1919. The seat shared boundaries with the UK Parliament constituency of the same name.

== Councillors ==
Year	Name	Party	Name	Party
1889	Richard Stevens Sly	Progressive	Philip Meadows Martineau	Progressive
1892	Andrew Mercer	Labour Progressive	Philip Meadows Martineau	Progressive
1895	Harry Marks	Moderate	Dalby Williams	Moderate
1898	Christopher Balian	Progressive	Charles Barratt	Progressive
1900	John Ernest Matthews	Progressive	Charles Barratt	Progressive
1901	George Foster	Conservative	John Smith	Progressive
1904	Harry Gosling	Progressive	John Smith	Progressive
1907	Harry Gosling	Progressive	Percy Coleman Simmons	Municipal Reform
1910	Harry Gosling	Progressive	Charles Mathew	Progressive

== Election results ==
1889 London County Council election: St George
Party	Candidate	Votes	%	±%
Progressive	Richard Stevens Sly	1,146		
Progressive	Philip Meadows Martineau	786		
Moderate	Frederick Joseph White Dellow	558		
Moderate	Robert Gresley Hall	175		
Progressive win (new seat)				
Progressive win (new seat)				

1892 London County Council election: St George
Party	Candidate	Votes	%	±%
Progressive	Philip Meadows Martineau	1,424		
Labour Progressive	Andrew Mercer	1,276		
Moderate	Frederick Joseph White Dellow	642		
Progressive hold		Swing		
Labour Progressive hold		Swing		

1895 London County Council election: St George
Party	Candidate	Votes	%	±%
Moderate	Harry Marks	1,453		
Moderate	Dalby Williams	1,335		
Progressive	Philip Meadows Martineau	1,259		
Progressive	Andrew Mercer	1,181		
Moderate gain from Progressive		Swing		
Moderate hold		Swing		

1898 London County Council election: St George
Party	Candidate	Votes	%	±%
Progressive	Charles Barratt	1,510		
Progressive	Christopher Balian	1,458		
Moderate	J. Abrahams	1,232		
Moderate	Dalby Williams	1,227		
Progressive gain from Moderate		Swing		
Progressive gain from Moderate		Swing		

1901 London County Council election: St George
Party	Candidate	Votes	%	±%
Progressive	John Smith	1,123	26.0	−1.8
Conservative	George Foster	1,117	25.9	+3.2
Conservative	Francis Anderton	1,047	24.3	+1.7
Progressive	John Ernest Matthews	1,024	23.7	−3.1
Progressive hold		Swing		
Conservative gain from Progressive		Swing	+2.4	

1904 London County Council election: St George
Party	Candidate	Votes	%	±%
Progressive	Harry Gosling	1,350		
Progressive	John Smith	1,263		
Conservative	George Foster	1,095		
Conservative	H. H. Wells	1,045		
Majority				
Progressive gain from Conservative		Swing		
Progressive hold		Swing		

1907 London County Council election: St George
Party	Candidate	Votes	%	±%
Progressive	Harry Gosling	1,183		
Municipal Reform	Percy Coleman Simmons	1,104		
Progressive	John Smith	1,035		
Roman Catholic	T. King	952		
Municipal Reform	W. R. Smith	881		
Roman Catholic	J. W. Linch	632		
Majority				
Progressive hold		Swing		
Municipal Reform gain from Progressive		Swing		

1910 London County Council election: St George
Party	Candidate	Votes	%	±%
Progressive	Harry Gosling	1,532		
Progressive	Charles James Mathew	1,492		
Municipal Reform	Percy Coleman Simmons	1,147		
Municipal Reform	G. W. Gilbert	887		
Independent	Frederick Wallace Brame	56		
Majority				
Progressive hold		Swing		
Progressive gain from Municipal Reform		Swing		

1913 London County Council election: St George
Party	Candidate	Votes	%	±%
Progressive	Harry Gosling	1,246		
Progressive	Charles James Mathew	1,209		
Municipal Reform	P. Daniel	961		
Municipal Reform	D. Knocker	929		
Independent	J. Dibbs	164		
Independent	Frederick Wallace Brame	24		
Majority				
Progressive hold		Swing		
Progressive hold		Swing		
