= Marianne Maderna =

Austrian artist

- Born: 6 March 1944 (age 82); Austria
- Education: Federal Training and Research Institute of Graphic Arts; Academy of Fine Arts Vienna
- Known for: Sculpture; Installation
- Awards: Honorary Prize of Lower Austria; 1991; Prize of the City of Vienna; 1996
- Website: www.mariannemaderna.com

Marianne Maderna (born 1944) is an Austrian installation artist.

== Life ==
Maderna's mother, Katharina, was a publisher's reader, her father the children's books writer Karl Bruckner. Maderna attended the Graphic Training and Research Institute in Vienna, Austria, from 1959 to 1964, then emigrated to the US. She returned to Austria in the same year and graduated from the Academy of Fine Arts Vienna in 1969 (MA 1972). In 1991, she was awarded the Honorary Prize of Lower Austria, and in 1996 the City of Vienna Prize for Visual Art. Maderna lives in Vienna and Aggsbach in Lower Austria. In 2014, she participated in the foundation of the MMMuseum in the Aggsbach Charterhouse.

Her works can be found in the Artothek des Bundes im 21er Haus, Vienna, the Blickle Foundation, the Austrian Museum of the 21st Century, the Albertina Graphic Collection, the MUSA Collection of the City of Vienna, LENTOS Kunstmuseum Linz, the State Museum of Lower Austria, and the Austrian Sculpture Park in Graz.

== Work ==
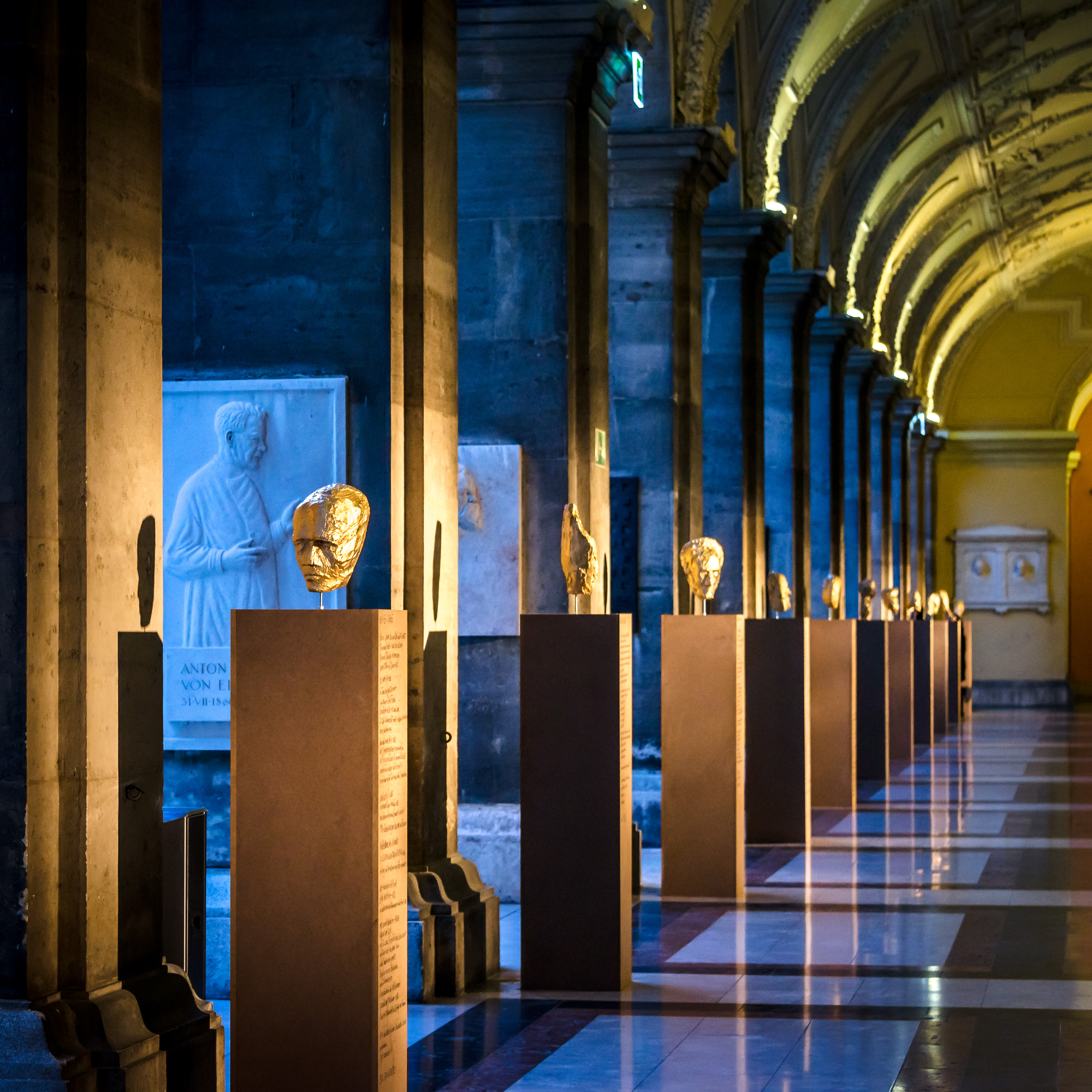
Marianne Maderna, Radical Busts, sculptural installation on the occasion of the 650th anniversary of the University of Vienna, 2015 University of Vienna

Marianne Maderna is an interdisciplinary installation artist and performer. Her work discusses social themes relevant to the human condition, combining sculpture, video, drawing, endurance performance, improvised music and poetic texts. Maderna examines and finds new formulations for human behaviour patterns and hierarchical systems. In a climbing performance in 2005, she painted a Viennese flak tower from the Second World War with graffiti. In 2013, she presented her world theatre Humanimals at the Dominican Church in Krems.

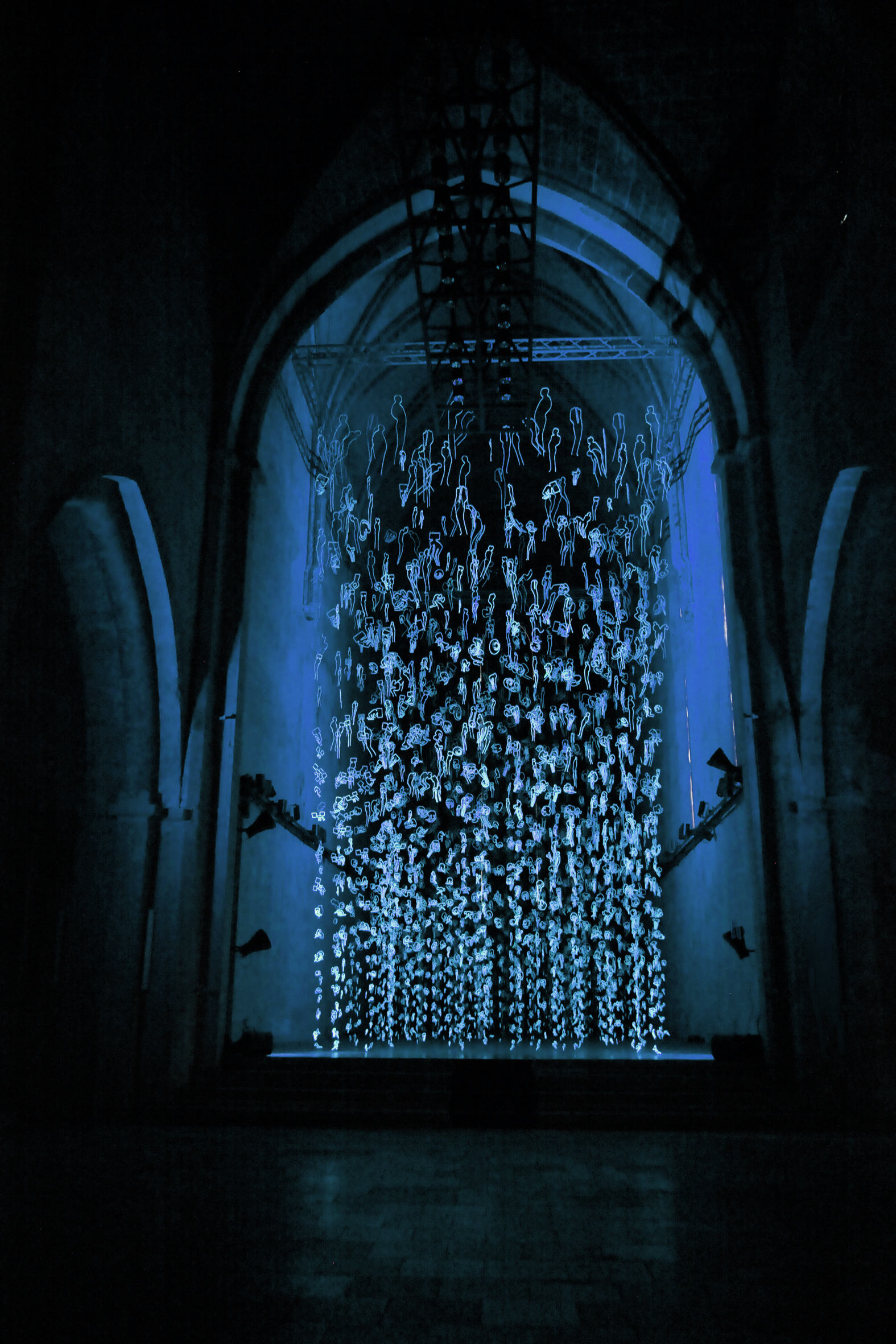
Marianne Maderna, Humanimals, sculptural installation at the Dominican Church / Krems, Zeitkunst, Lower Austria, 2013

This was a large spatial installation with thousands of nocturnally glowing hanging sculptures and a hand-drawn 3D animation as a walk-in video projection. In the same year, she walked over the Danube as a female pope in self-constructed aqua shoes. In 2015, on the occasion of the 650th anniversary of the University of Vienna, Marianne Maderna presented 36 busts of famous women in juxtaposition to the 153 permanently installed busts and plaques of male notables.

== Solo exhibitions ==
- 2015 Radical Busts, Arkadenhof, University of Vienna
- 2014 Foundation of the MMMuseum in the Aggsbach Charterhouse
- 2013 Humanimals, Dominican Church / Krems, Zeitkunst, Lower Austria
- 2011 Mighties & Frighties & Academy mm, Palais Kabelwerk / Artspace, Vienna
- 2006 One To, kunsthaus muerz, Mürzzuschlag
- 2005 One To, Academy of Fine Arts Vienna
- 2005 Budhines, Christines ..., installation and graffiti performance, Flakturm Arenbergpark, Vienna
- 1996 Das erste Haus, Architekturzentrum Wien Museumsquartier, Vienna
- 1991 Raum und Ausgang, Wiener Secession
- 1987 Skulpturen im Umraum, Wiener Secession
- 1984 Skulpturen und Zeichen, Landesmuseum Niederösterreich, Vienna
- 1982 Marianne Maderna, Wiener Secession

== Catalogues ==
- Radical Busts, with texts by Maia Damianovic, Sigrid Schmitz, and Luce Irigaray. Poems: Marianne Maderna
- Humanimals. Zeitkunst Lower Austria, with texts by Eva Badura, Maia Damianovic, and Alexandra Schantl, Verlag für moderne Kunst, Nürnberg 2013, ISBN 978-3-86984-445-9
- Historysteria, with texts by, Kerstin Braun, Jacques Derrida, Sophie Freud, Elisabeth List, Elisabeth von Samsonow, Springer, Vienna, New York et al. 2008, ISBN 978-3-211-75582-2
- Raum und Ausgang, with texts by Jacques Derrida, Hildegunt Amanshauser, Ulli Moser, Marianne Maderna, Wiener Secession, Vienna. 1991, ISBN 3-900803-45-5
- Raum und Ausgang, with facsimile text, Triton Verlag, Vienna 1997, ISBN 3-191310-69-X
