= Brooklyn Arts Gallery =

Coordinates: 40.6943°N 73.9941°W

The Brooklyn Arts Gallery was Brooklyn's first art gallery. Located in the borough's Brooklyn Heights neighborhood in New York City, the gallery first opened on January 22, 1958, with the purpose being to "provide facilities where artists may display their work to the public at a minimum cost and without red tape." Open to the public and free of charge to both patrons and artists, the gallery was privately established for the benefit of lesser-known artists in Brooklyn by its founder and director, Sylvia Dwyer. The Gallery's exhibits of paintings, drawings, prints, sculptures, and ceramics reflected many artistic movements of that era, including expressionism, realism, modern, non-objective, and abstraction. Throughout the 1960s, the gallery remained a center for artists and was heralded for its cultural influence on the neighborhood.

== History ==
Like many local artists, Ms. Dwyer displayed her work at the Washington Square Outdoor Art Exhibit in Greenwich Village. In 1957 she sold a painting to a lawyer who worked in a professional building in Brooklyn Heights. He then showed it to an attorney colleague, Alfred Lo Schiaro, and the two of them provided the seed money for the gallery. They introduced her to a dentist who had an office in their building, Dr. Samuel Bark, who opened his reception area to house the gallery’s first show. The Brooklyn Arts Gallery officially opened on January 22, 1958 at 141 Montague Street, and 21 artists appeared in the first exhibit.

In June 1959, the landlord of the gallery's building filed a court case against the gallery, contending that it was an illegal tenant because the building was for "Professionals Only". The landlord attempted to evict the gallery and the ensuing legal battle was covered by local television and newspaper outlets. The case was heard by Municipal Court Judge S. Reymart Alter, although he was ultimately unable to render his decision as claimants withdrew their complaint. Judge Alter was quoted to say, “I regret the question was dropped. […] The professional status of the artist never has been settled legally.”

In 1961, it moved into the Our Lady of Lebanon Maronite Cathedral (Brooklyn) at 113 Remsen Street, where it remained until March 1964, when the gallery moved to Flatbush Avenue in southern Brooklyn. The Brooklyn Arts Gallery closed in 1972 due to Dwyer's failing health.

== Notable artists ==
A 64-year-old painter, Andy Johnson, was working as the custodian and superintendent of a local building and had converted a basement coal bin into his art studio and painted by light bulb. His work was soon discovered by Dwyer. Johnson went on to receive many awards and international acclaim, most notably from his home country, Sweden; his works were also collected by Jacqueline Kennedy and Lady Bird Johnson for the White House.

Vincent J. Vita was a concert pianist blinded and paralyzed by a brain tumor in 1959.

August Satre was a Norwegian painter who, had once been popular but whose artwork had been forgotten when Dwyer saw the 85-year-old painting at the Christian Home for the Aged. An oil painter in the realism movement, he was noted for his landscapes and accurate depictions of city life.

Other notable painters that exhibited at the Brooklyn Arts Gallery included Mary Fife Laning, Edward Laning, Bill Preston, and Jack Katz. Local artists also included Scott Croft, Hilda Weingarten, and Eugenia Zundel.
