= Andrew Demeter =

American political activist, journalist

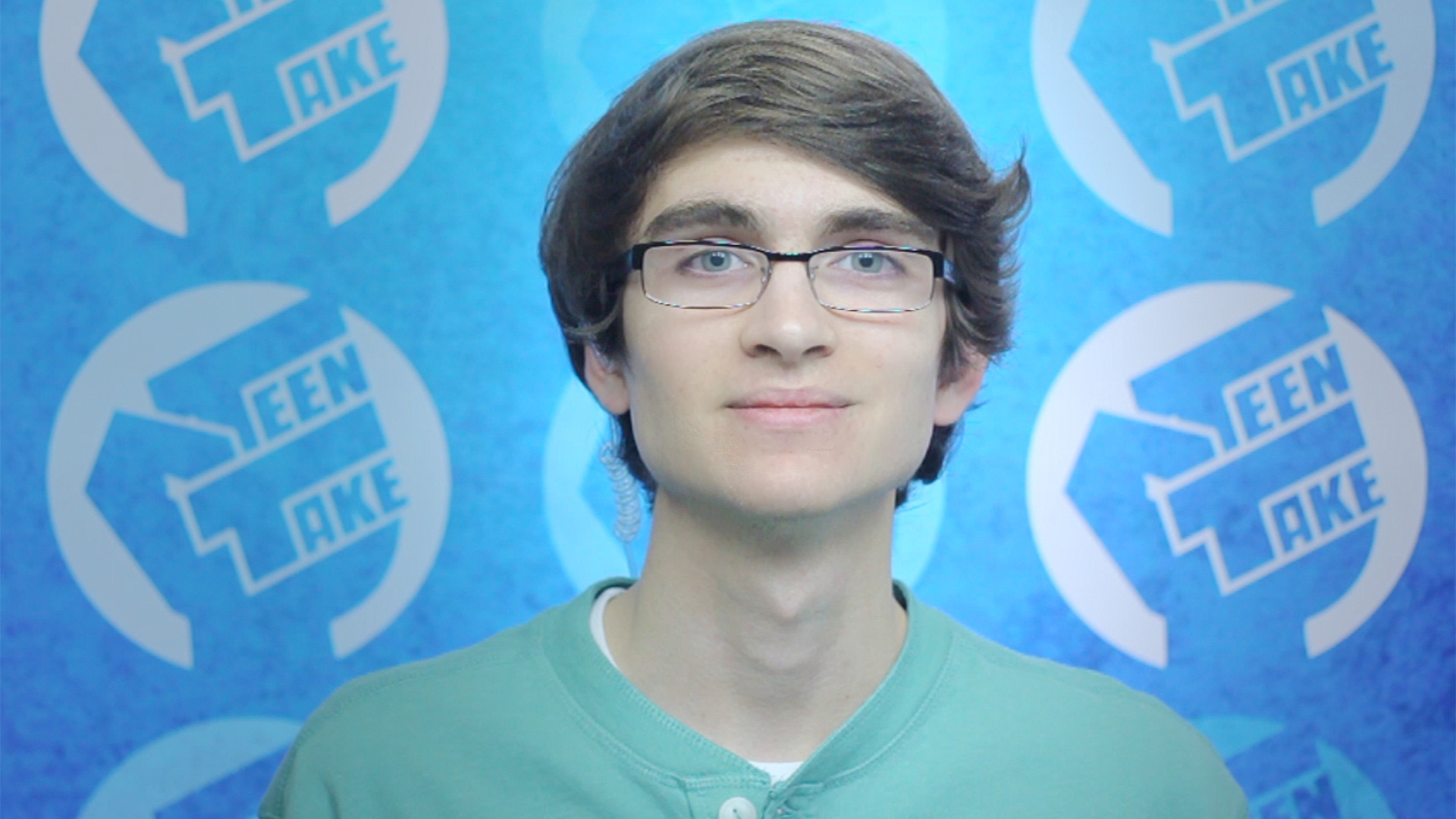
- Citizenship: USA
- Known for: TeenTake
- Website: www.andrewdemeter.com

Andrew Demeter is a young American political activist, amateur filmmaker, and journalist. His documentary We The People, Genetically Modified? won first prize in C-SPAN's 2014 StudentCam competition. T

== Biography ==
Andrew Demeter was born in Cleveland, Ohio, where he currently lives with his family. He attends high school and is now in his Junior year.

When he was in sixth grade, Demeter started experimenting with his father's video camera by interviewing relatives during family gatherings.

== We The People, Genetically Modified? Documentary ==
In tenth grade, Demeter was informed by his computer teacher — Vicki Eby — of StudentCam, an annual video competition that invites middle- and high-school students to produce short documentaries on an issue of national importance. While at first Demeter juggled with ideas related to the 2012 National Defense Authorization Act or the implications of surveillance with military drones used in warfare, he eventually chose to document issues concerning genetically modified organisms, a topic that "transcends all sociopolitical boundaries."

Assisted by one of his classmates, Andrew Wright, Demeter produced We The People, Genetically Modified?, a 7-minute documentary that explores several facets of the GMO controversy, such as testing, labeling, and impacts on both the environment and human health.

Demeter's documentary features C-SPAN programming (per contest requirements) and interviews with farmers, consumers, biologists, public health officials, and even investigative reporter Ben Swann. In April 2014, the video was chosen as one of five "First Prize" winners in the StudentCam competition. "That documentary was so clever," said C-SPAN's founder Brian Lamb.

Later that month, Demeter visited Washington D.C. to participate in a roundtable discussion about his winning entry with Greta Brawner and the other top four winners. He also met with U.S. Senator Rob Portman.

Demeter, on the same trip, toured the U.S. Capitol and landed a meeting with Minority Leader of the U.S. House of Representatives Nancy Pelosi."
