= Ford Doolittle =

American-Canadian biochemist (born 1941)

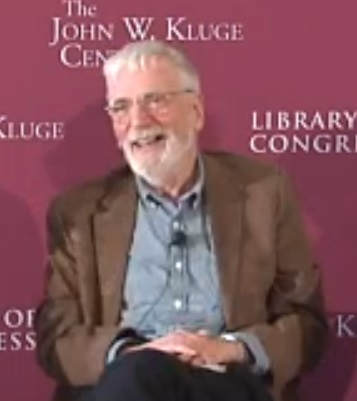
- Doolittle at the John W. Kluge Center at the Library of Congress in 2016
- Born: Warren Ford Doolittle; November 30, 1941 (age 84); Urbana, Illinois, U.S.
- Education: Harvard University (BA 1963), Stanford University (PhD 1967), NSCAD University, Nova Scotia (BA in photography)
- Known for: Horizontal gene transfer research
- Awards: National Academy of Sciences, Royal Society of Canada
- Scientific career
- Fields: Cyanobacteria, chloroplasts
- Institutions: Dalhousie University
- Thesis: Regulation of the tryptophan operon in Escherichia coli (1968)
- Doctoral advisor: Charles Yanofsky
- Doctoral students: Andrew J. Roger; Patrick J. Keeling

Warren Ford Doolittle CC FRSC FRS (born in November 30, 1941 in Urbana, Illinois) is an evolutionary and molecular biologist. He is a member of the US National Academy of Sciences a Fellow of the Royal Society of Canada, a Fellow of the Royal Society (United Kingdom) and of the Norwegian Academy of Science and Letters. He is also the winner of the 2013 Herzberg Medal of the Natural Sciences and Engineering Research Council of Canada and the 2017 Killam Prize. In June 2025 he was appointed as a Companion of the Order of Canada.

Doolittle has made significant contributions to the study of cyanobacteria. He found evidence for the endosymbiont origins of chloroplasts, and developed a theoretical basis for the initial evolution of eukaryotes. He has shown the importance of horizontal gene transfer in prokaryotic evolution.

As of 2007, he has been professor emeritus at Dalhousie University in Halifax, Nova Scotia. He received his BA in biochemical sciences from Harvard University in 1963 and his PhD from Stanford University in 1967, under Charles Yanofsky. He went on to do postdoctoral fellowships with Sol Spiegelman and Norman R. Pace.

In 1981, Doolittle received some level of notoriety for his article in The CoEvolution Quarterly entitled "Is Nature Really Motherly?". This was a sharp rebuttal of J. E. Lovelock's formulation of the Gaia Theory. Doolittle's article is often cited by Lovelock's critics. He has had a re-think about Gaia, publishing an open access book, Darwinizing Gaia, in 2024, with MIT Press.

Because of his philosophical musings on the non-existence of an all-encompassing Tree of life, Doolittle has occasionally been cited by Intelligent Design activists. However, though Doolittle argues that a bifurcating tree is not an adequate metaphor for the evolution of life on earth, he is not a supporter of Intelligent Design. A single complete tree relating all of life on earth is not a necessary component of evolution.

As of 2014 Doolittle was involved in a debate about the proper use of function (biology) within evolutionary biology sparked by controversy over the results of the ENCODE consortium stating that 80% of the genome is "functional". He is a supporter of the concept of junk DNA.

In addition to his contributions to evolutionary biology, Doolittle is an artist who studied at NSCAD University, achieving a BA in photography.

== Awards and honors ==
- 2013 Herzberg Medal of the Natural Sciences and Engineering Research Council of Canada
- 2017 Killam Prize

== Selected publications ==
- W. Ford Doolittle (2004). "W. Ford Doolittle". Curr. Biol. 14 (5): R176–R177. Bibcode:2004CBio...14.R176F. doi:10.1016/j.cub.2004.02.010. PMID 15028226. S2CID 41295582.
- Brown, James R.; Doolittle, W. Ford (1997). "Archaea and the prokaryote-to-eukaryote transition". Microbiology and Molecular Biology Reviews. 61 (4): 456–502. doi:10.1128/mmbr.61.4.456-502.1997. PMC 232621. PMID 9409149.
- Doolittle, W. Ford (1999). "Phylogenetic Classification and the Universal Tree". Science. 284 (5423): 2124–2129. doi:10.1126/science.284.5423.2124. PMID 10381871.
- Baldauf, S. L.; Roger, A. J.; Wenk-Siefert, I.; Doolittle, W. Ford (2000). "A Kingdom-Level Phylogeny of Eukaryotes Based on Combined Protein Data". Science. 290 (5493): 972–977. Bibcode:2000Sci...290..972B. doi:10.1126/science.290.5493.972. PMID 11062127.
