= Andy Johnson (artist) =

Swedish-American painter

Andy Johnson (born Anders Johannson; 1893 in Hyssma, Sweden – 1971) was a Swedish-American painter. He started painting at age 64 in a coal bin by the light of a 75-watt bulb. He was discovered by Sylvia Dwyer while working as the custodian and superintendent of a local Brooklyn Heights building, and appeared in multiple exhibits in the Brooklyn Arts Gallery. As his career continued, his art and story became the subject of many international expatriate newspapers.

He received recognition for his works in oil depicting scenery and interior memories of his native land, Sweden. His "vivid colors and landscapes remind many of American primitives." His work went on to receive international acclaim, most notably from his home country of Sweden.

In his syndicated column, Mel Heimer quoted Ms. Dwyer describing him as "a sort of younger Grandma Moses." His work was also collected by Jacqueline Kennedy and Lady Bird Johnson for the White House. He died in April 1971. "His work remains, and the beauty he has left behind is immeasurable."

== Awards and recognition ==
- Accepted by American Swedish Institute 1959
- Silvermine Guild 1960/1961
- Accepted for exhibition at the Chautauqua Institute 1961/1962
- First Place - Murray Hill Art competition 1958/1959
- Best in Show - Flatbush-Nostrand Board of Trade Art Competition 1965/1966
- First Place - Brooklyn Heights Promenade Art Show, 1966
- Best in Show - Brooklyn Heights Promenade Art Show 1967/1969
- Collectors: Dr. Norton Ritz; Dr. Samuel Achs; Mr. & Mrs. Van Outryve; Mr. & Mrs. Ira Wolf.
