= Drew Johnson (disambiguation) =

Drew Johnson (born 1979/1980) is a political commentator who was the founder and first president of the Tennessee Center for Policy Research.

Drew Johnson may also refer to:

- Drew Johnson (comics), comic book illustrator (Silver Age (DC Comics), Tartarus (DC Comics), Tomb Raider (comics), Down to Earth (comics))
- Drew Johnson (broadcaster), former host of SPEED Center

== See also ==
- Andrew Johnson (disambiguation)
