= Andrew Wanamilil Malibirr =

Aboriginal Australian artist

Andrew Wanamilil Malibirr (born 1980) is an Aboriginal Australian artist, belonging to the Yolngu people of Arnhem Land in the Northern Territory of Australia. Wanamilil is the current Chairperson for the Bula'Bula Arts Aboriginal Corporation in Ramingining, Northern Territory, Australia.

== Biography ==
Andrew Wanamilil was born in 1980. He is the son of Bobby Bununggurr Malibirr and the brother of Steve Wanamilil Malibirr, who is also an active artist at Bula'Bula Arts. Wanamilil belongs to the Yirritja moiety and the Ganalbingu clan of Ngalyindi. He is married to Cecilia Bambarrawuy, another practicing artist at the Bula'Bula Arts center.

== Artistic career ==
Wanamilil stated in an interview that he learned to paint from his father and his grandmother. He primarily paints Raypiny Dhawu (Freshwater Story) and the wildlife seen at Arafura Swamp, where his family's country (Nyalyindi) is located. Wanamilil's artistic role also holds significance in the Raminingining community as well. His artworks and teachings for the younger generation within the community preserve stories of the Yolngu people and scripture.

One of Wanamilil's paintings, Warrnyu Dhawu laba (Flying Fox Story leader), was a finalist for the 2022 National Emerging Art Prize.

Wanamilil participated in an exhibition titled Barrku Wanga (going to a faraway place) that was on display from November 18, 2023 to December 15, 2023. Wanamilil also participated in the 2023 Darwin Aboriginal Art Fair. In an interview about his experience at the 2023 DAAF, he said he was excited to share his art with Australians from across the nation and to return the following year.
