= Andrew Robinson =

Andrew or Andy Robinson may refer to:

== Entertainment ==
- Andrew Robinson (actor) (born 1942), American actor
- Andrew Cornell Robinson (born 1968), American artist
- Andrew R. Robinson, writer of Kaijudo and other television shows
- Andrew Robinson, comic book artist on Superman/Batman
- Andrew Robinson (Neighbours), a fictional Australian soap opera character

== Politics ==
- Andrew Robinson (West Virginia politician), American politician
- Andrew Robinson (UK politician), founder of the Pirate Party UK

== Sports ==
- Andrew Robinson (cricketer) (born 1981), Australian cricketer
- Andrew Robinson (water polo) (born 1988), Canadian water polo player
- Andy Robinson (footballer, born 1966), English former footballer
- Andy Robinson (footballer, born 1979), British football player
- Andy Robinson (footballer, born 1992), English footballer with Southampton F.C.
- Andy Robinson (born 1964), rugby union coach
- Andrew Robinson (canoeist), New Zealand slalom canoeist in 2006 Canoe Slalom World Cup

== Other ==
- Andrew Robinson Stoney (1747–1810), Anglo-Irish adventurer
- Andrew Ernest Robinson (1893–1964), Canadian Member of Parliament
- Andrew J. Robinson (builder) (died 1922), builder in New York City
- W. Andrew Robinson (born 1957), British non-fiction author
- Andy Robinson (design manager), curator and art manager
- Andy Robinson (loyalist), Northern Ireland paramilitary leader
- Andrew Robinson, statistician and director of Centre of Excellence for Biosecurity Risk Analysis (CEBRA) in Melbourne
