= Andrew M. Davis =

American meteoriticist and professor of astronomy and geoscience

Andrew M. Davis (born 1950) is an American meteoriticist and professor of astronomy and geoscience at the University of Chicago. He is the son of American chemist and physicist Raymond Davis Jr., a Nobel Prize in Physics laureate. His main field of study is the origin of the elements by stellar nucleosynthesis. He currently is the head of a project to build a new instrument called the ion nanoprobe, which will allow isotopic and chemical analysis at finer scales than any contemporary instrument. He is also studying the cometary dust and contemporary interstellar dust returned to Earth by the Stardust spacecraft in 2006. In 2018, he was made Fellow of the American Association for the Advancement of Science.

== Academic Research ==
He is conducting research about the isotopic compositions of refractory inclusions in meteorites to understand the earliest history of the Solar System. Short-lived chronometers such as the 26Al-26Mg system can resolve time differences of only a few tens of thousands of years for events that occurred 4.55 billion years ago. Isotopic fractionation effects and the relative abundances of trace elements are used to constrain thermal histories and redox conditions in the solar nebula and on the asteroidal parent bodies of meteorites.

Tiny (<10 μm in diameter) grains of silicon carbide, graphite, and other refractory minerals and rocks condensed around dying stars (mostly red giant stars and supernovae) survived potentially destructive processes in the interstellar medium and during solar system formation, and can now be found in meteorites. These grains preserve an isotopic record of the nucleosynthesis in individual stars. He is measuring the isotopic compositions of these grains with a new technique, resonant ionization mass spectrometry, that was developed by his collaborators at Argonne National Laboratory.

== Honors and awards ==
Asteroid 6947 Andrewdavis, discovered by Schelte Bus during the U.K. Schmidt–Caltech Asteroid Survey in 1981, was named after him. The official naming citation was published by the Minor Planet Center on 9 August 2006 (M.P.C. 57420).

== Publication ==
=== Books ===
- Davis A. M. (ed.) (2004) Meteorites, Planets, and Comets, Vol. 1 Treatise on Geochemistry (Eds. H. D. Holland and K. K. Turekian), Elsevier-Pergamon, Oxford, 737 p.
- Davis A. M. (ed.) (2007) Meteorites, Planets, and Comets, Vol. 1 Treatise on Geochemistry, 2nd Edition (Eds. H. D. Holland and K. K. Turekian), Elsevier, Oxford, published electronically at Treatise on Geochemistry | ScienceDirect.
