= Andrew Barnett =

Anglo-Australian businessman

Andrew Charles Robert Barnett OBE (born 1968) is the Director of the UK Branch of the Calouste Gulbenkian Foundation.

Barnett was born in New South Wales and has dual Australian and British citizenship. He attended the University of St Andrews, graduating in 1990 with an MA in Modern History.

In 2002, Barnett was the Director of Communications at the UK Sports Council, where the advocacy plan for bidding London as a host city for the 2012 Olympics was developed. From 2005-2007 he was Director of Communications at the Joseph Rowntree Foundation and Housing Trust. In 2007, he took on the directorship of the UK branch of the Calouste Gulbenkian Foundation. He is a director of the Forces in Mind Trust and a committee member of Healthwatch England.

Barnett was appointed Officer of the Order of the British Empire (OBE) in the 2021 New Year Honours for services to social change.
