= Andrew Walcott =

British sprinter

Andrew Alexander Walcott (born 11 January 1975) is a former English and GB sprinter. He won the 200 metres at the 1994 AAA Junior Indoor Championships (a world leading time) in Birmingham.

Most of his sprinting success came in the 200 meters. At club level he represented Wolverhampton & Bilston and is also higher claim to Belgrave Harriers. In addition to the AAA Junior Indoor Championships, he also won the 1990 English Schools Championship and British Schools International Match at the intermediate level.

He currently runs a Child Fitness Centre called SDR Progression performance Centre for children with cerebral palsy.
