= Andrew J. Roger =

Canadian-Australian molecular biologist

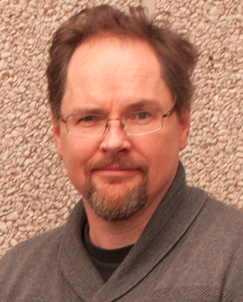
- Andrew J. Roger
- Education: University of British Columbia, Dalhousie University
- Known for: Eukaryotic organisms, biology and evolution of mitochondria, hydrogenosomes and mitosomes, comparative genomics of unicellular eukaryotes, modeling the evolution of genes and genomes
- Scientific career
- Workplaces: Dalhousie University
- Thesis: Studies on the phylogeny and gene structure of early-branching eukaryotes (1998)
- Doctoral advisor: Ford Doolittle

Andrew J. Roger is a Canadian-Australian molecular biologist and evolutionary bioinformatician. He is currently a professor in the Department of Biochemistry and Molecular Biology at Dalhousie University and was the founding director (from 2008 to 2017) of the inter-departmental Centre for Comparative Genomics and Evolutionary Bioinformatics (CGEB).

== Education and career ==
Roger received his B.Sc from the University of British Columbia and his PhD from Dalhousie University. Roger was elected as a fellow of the Royal Society of Canada in 2012 for his work on eukaryotic superkingdoms, his work on the evolution of mitochondrion-related organelles in anaerobic protists and his contribution to investigating and improving phylogenetic models

=== Research ===
A former student of Ford Doolittle, Roger's research focuses on the 'deep' Tree of Life, especially determining the super-kingdom-level relationships amongst eukaryotes and clarifying the nature of the last eukaryotic common ancestor (LECA). Using phylogenomic approaches Roger's group elucidates the patterns and process of genome evolution in eukaryotic microbes. His research also addresses the evolutionary origin of mitochondria, hydrogenosomes, and mitosomes, the role of lateral (horizontal) gene transfer in eukaryotic genome evolution and how anaerobic parasites evolved from free-living ancestors.

== Selected publications ==
- Roger, A.J. and Susko, E. (2018) Molecular clocks provide little information to date methanogenic archaea. Nature Ecol. Evol. 2: 1676–1677.
- Muñoz-Gómez, S.A., Hess, S., Burger, G., Lang, B.F., Susko, E., Slamovits, C.H. and Roger, A.J. (2019) An updated phylogeny of the Alphaproteobacteria reveals that the parasitic Rickettsiales and *Holosporales have independent origins. eLife, Feb. 25; 8. pii: e42535.
- Hess, S., Eme, L., Roger, A.J. and Simpson, A.G.B. (2019) A natural toroidal microswimmer propelled by a rotary eukaryotic flagellum. Nature Microbiol. 4:1620-1626.
- Susko E. and Roger, A.J. (2019) On the use of information criteria for model selection in phylogenetics. Mol. Biol. Evol., Nov. 5
- Susko E, Roger AJ., (2013) Problems with estimation of ancestral frequencies under stationary models. Syst Biol. 62(2):330-8
- Stairs, C.W., Roger, A.J. and Hampl, V., (2011) Eukaryotic pyruvate formate lyase and its activating enzyme were acquired laterally from a firmicute. Mol. Biol. Evol. 28:2087-2099
