= Andrew Essex =

American business executive and author

- Born: Brooklyn, NY
- Education: New York University, M.A
- Occupations: Journalist, author, businessman
- Years active: 1988–present
- Known for: Droga5, Tribeca Film Festival, Plan A
- Notable work: The End of Advertising: Why It Had to Die, and the Creative Resurrection to Come
- Website: Andrew Essex Biography

Andrew Essex is an American business executive and author based in New York City. He is a Senior Managing Partner at Tata Consultancy Services, a subsidiary of the Tata Group. Previously, he was a Senior Advisor at McKinsey & Company. Essex is the former chief executive officer of Tribeca Enterprises, the parent company of Tribeca Film Festival. Until 2015, he was the chairman and founding CEO of Droga5, a creative-advertising agency.

Additionally, he is the cofounder of creative marketing services company, Plan A, along with MT Carney. During the administration of Mayor Bill de Blasio, he chaired the Mayor’s Creative Council, a coalition of executives and creative leaders from private marketing, advertising and media aiming to more effectively connect New Yorkers to information, resources and initiatives. Essex is a frequent public speaker on media and marketing strategies. He is an angel investor, public speaker, educator, and advisor and board member to multiple platforms.

== Early life ==
Essex holds a Bachelor of Arts degree and a Master of Arts degree in American literature from New York University. He began his career as a journalist and wrote pieces for The New Yorker in the 1990s. Later, he held editorial posts at Entertainment Weekly, Salon.com as well as The New Yorker and was a consultant for the launch of US Weekly magazine.

== Career ==
In August 2002, Essex was promoted to executive editor of Details magazine. At Details, he oversaw the magazine’s branding of the metrosexual phenomenon. While looking for advertising executives to include in Details magazine's 2002 annual power list, he met David Droga who was then the worldwide creative director of agency Publicis Worldwide. In 2004, Essex left Details magazine and became the editor in chief of Absolute, a luxury magazine. During Essex's tenure at Absolute, Droga and Essex kept in touch and often shared their views on how their respective industries were flawed. After working for several years, both wanted to start an entrepreneurial venture so they began working on ideas. Essex left Absolute in 2005 and the next year the two founded Droga5, an advertising agency.

Shortly after joining Droga5, Essex was named its CEO. Under his leadership, the agency created UNICEF Tap Project and The Great Schlep of 2008. In April 2013, Essex became the Vice Chairman of Droga5 after working as CEO for five years. He stepped down from the position of Vice Chairman and left the company in July 2015.

In January 2016, Essex joined Tribeca Enterprises as its CEO. In October 2017, Essex stepped down as CEO of Tribeca Enterprises.

As of 2018 Essex sits on the board of the American Advertising Federation, Friends of + Pool, the iHeart Media Creative Advisory Counsel, and iPic Entertainment. Essex is also the chair of the Mayor of New York City's Creative Council.

=== Plan A ===
In 2018 Essex founded creative holding company Plan A along with CEO and cofounder MT Carney. Plan A, a federation of agencies, merged firms Van's General Store, Untitled Worldwide, Twin Studio, and Beekman Social for a combined $70 million in revenues. In 2020, Chapter, Tether, The New New Thing and TwoFiveSix joined Plan A. Essex recruited CAA founder Michael Ovitz along with Ben Lerer, Alexis Ohanian and Michael Kassan as investors and advisors. Regarding Essex's combined firm, Ovitz said: "I've always made my decisions based on two factors: intellectual analysis and my gut. When they meet that's a go for me." In late 2018 the company debuted what Adweek called "a bright, poppy brand campaign" for online shoe retailer, Zappos. In March 2019, Campaign Live reported that Plan A added Sabrina Yu, who worked for over a decade between branding agency Select World and as a director at Svedka Vodka, as its managing director.

=== Authorship ===
Essex is author of The End of Advertising: Why It Had to Die and the Creative Resurrection to Come and the co-author of three books: A Very Public Offering: The Story of the Globe.com, Chasing Cool, with former Barney’s CEO Gene Pressman, and Le Freak: An Upside Down Story of Family, Disco and Destiny, with musician Nile Rodgers.

== Reception ==
Essex is a frequent public speaker on media, marketing and monetization strategies. He is an angel investor in many technology firms and is an advisor to the White House Office of Digital Strategy and the Wharton SEI Center for Advanced Studies in Management.

Essex has been a television commentator for ABC, CNN, Anderson Cooper, The View and Fox News and his writing has been published in The New Yorker, The New York Times, The New York Times Magazine, Rolling Stone, and Outside magazine. He has co-authored four books: A Very Public Offering: The Story of the Globe.com, Chasing Cool, with Gene Pressman, Le Freak: An Upside Down Story of Family, Disco and Destiny, with Nile Rodgers and "The End of Advertising: Why It Had to Die, and the Creative Resurrection to Come".

== Personal life ==
Essex lives with his wife and two children in Dumbo, Brooklyn in New York City.

== Bibliography ==
- A Very Public Offering: The Story of the Globe.com
- Chasing Cool with Gene Pressman
- Le Freak: An Upside Down Story of Family, Disco and Destiny with Nile Rodgers
- The End of Advertising: Why It Had to Die, and the Creative Resurrection to Come
