= Andrew Monteiro =

Brazilian footballer (born 1992)

Personal information
- Full name: Andrew Bruno Teixeira Monteiro
- Date of birth: 9 January 1992 (age 34)
- Place of birth: Belém, Brazil
- Height: 1.79 m (5 ft 10 in)
- Position: Forward

Team information
- Current team: Aves
- Number: 9

Youth career
- 2011: Coritiba

Senior career*
Years	Team	Apps	(Gls)
2011–2013	Ribeirão	40	(13)
2013–	Aves	45	(9)
- * Club domestic league appearances and goals as of 3 September 2014

Andrew Bruno Teixeira Monteiro (born 9 January 1992) is a Brazilian professional footballer who plays for C.D. Aves as a forward.

== Career ==
On 27 July 2013, Monteiro made his professional debut with Aves in a 2013–14 Taça da Liga match against Tondela.
