= Andrew Jenike =

American engineer (1914–2003)

Andrew W. Jenike
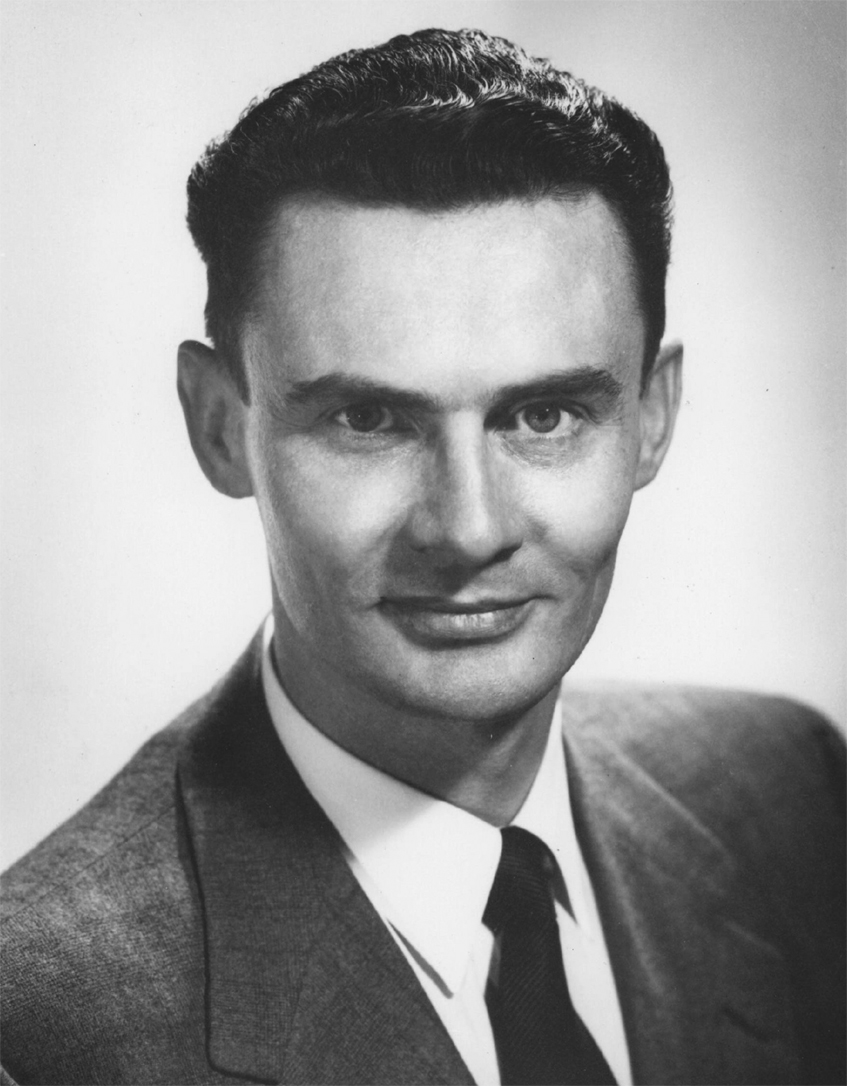
- Born: April 16, 1914; Poland
- Died: 8 August 2003 (aged 89)

Andrew W. Jenike (16 April 1914 – 8 August 2003) was an American engineer who developed and expanded the science of bulk material handling. He founded and served as company president for engineering consulting firm Jenike & Johanson, Inc. and published Utah Engineering Experiment Station Bulletins 123 and 108, which introduce the idea of mass flow.

== Early life ==
Andrew Jenike was born in Poland on April 16, 1914. He graduated from the Warsaw University of Technology with a B.S. in Mechanical Engineering in 1939. Upon graduation, he entered the Polish Army, where he served with distinction as an officer in the Second World War.

In peacetime, Jenike attended the University of London where in 1949 he received his Ph.D. in Structural Engineering. While in England, he met his wife Una, and they immigrated to Canada and then to Salt Lake City, Utah in the United States.

== Career ==
In his early career, Jenike worked for several engineering design firms as a mechanical and structural engineer. At age 39, Jenike began studying the design of bins and hoppers for the storage and flow of bulk solids. He approached the National Science Foundation and other groups for research funding. They required him to be affiliated with a college or university, so Jenike became an associate research professor at the University of Utah where he spent seven years developing basic theories, test equipment, and design procedures. In 1957, he was appointed as vice chairman of the Utah Engineers Council.

A combination of some of his crude bin pressure measurements and the idea presented in V. V. Sokolovskii's book, Statics of Soil Media (Butterworth's Scientific, 1960) that soil stress varies directly proportional to the distance from a point gave rise to his Radial Stress Field concept.

Jenike is most strongly associated with the Jenike Shear Tester, which bears his name. Jenike developed the continuum mechanics approach to hopper design. He set forth these guiding principles in University of Utah Experimental Station Bulletins 108 and 123, the latter being one of the most cited work in the material handling field today. In these bulletins he defined "mass flow," showed how the flow properties of bulk solids could be measured, and how these measurements could be used to design hoppers. Jenike was also the first to recognize the impact feeders play on achieving mass flow in a hopper.

Jenike designed the first mass flow bins for iron ore in 1960. In 1962, Jenike moved to Winchester, Massachusetts and entered full-time consulting. Four years later he was joined by Jerry Johanson, who had formerly worked with Jenike in graduate school. In 1966 Jenike incorporated the company Jenike & Johanson, Inc. The company was initially headquartered in the basement of Jenike's house. Jenike was president of the firm until he retired in 1979. He continued to conduct research for about eight years until, in 1987, a serious automobile accident prevented him from working further.

== Awards and recognitions ==
Jenike received the Humboldt Prize in 1976; in 1989 he was elected Fellow of the ASME; and in 1993 he became the first person outside of the United Kingdom to receive the Solids Handling Award from the Institution of Mechanical Engineers. In 2007 the British Material Handling Board officially recognized Jenike as the leading Bulk Technology Pioneer of the 20th Century on the grounds of "his outstanding contribution that transformed the storage and handling of bulk solids from an empirical industry to a science."
