= Andrew Guinand =

Australian mathematician (1912–1987)

Andrew Paul Guinand
- Born: 3 March 1912
- Died: 22 March 1987 (aged 75)
- Other names: Andrew Guinand
- Citizenship: Australian
- Scientific career
- Fields: Mathematics
- Institutions: University of New England, Australia

Andrew Paul Guinand (known as Andrew Guinand) (3 March 1912 – 22 March 1987) was an Australian mathematician and a professor at the University of New England.

== Early life and education ==
Guinand attended St Peter's College, Adelaide from 1924 to 1929. In 1930, he entered St Mark's College of the University of Adelaide to study mathematics. After graduating in 1933, Guinand attended the University of Oxford on a Rhodes Scholarship, where Edward Charles Titchmarsh supervised his doctoral research. From 1937 to 1938, he studied at Göttingen, after which he studied at Princeton University, until in 1940 he joined the Royal Canadian Air Force and served as a navigator.

Guinand worked as an assistant at the University of Cambridge, and then as a lecturer at the Royal Military College of Science, where he was eventually promoted to Associate professor of Mathematics. In 1955, he was named Head of department at the University of New England at Armidale. After two years at Armidale, he moved to the University of Alberta in Edmonton, Alberta, and in 1960 moved again to the University of Saskatchewan. In 1964, he moved once more, becoming the first chairman of the mathematics department at Trent University which had been founded the previous year.

== Work ==
Guinand's research included work in number theory (particularly prime numbers and the Riemann hypothesis), as well as generalizations of the Fourier transform, in addition to publications on assorted topics including air navigation and the computation of pi.

In 1959, he published a paper on the Poisson summation formula for which he presented a simpler solution. Guinand's work on this problem was largely forgotten and remained in obscurity until it was re-discovered by Yves Meyer in 2015.
