= Andrew Mercer (mayor) =

Mayor of Dunedin (1873-1874)

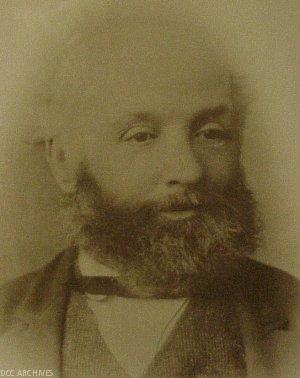
- Andrew Mercer

Mayor of Dunedin
- In office 1873-1874

Personal details
- Born: 1829 Fife, Scotland
- Died: 6 June 1902 (aged 72–73) Dunedin, New Zealand
- Occupation: Grocer, politician

Andrew Mercer (1829 – 6 June 1902) was Mayor of Dunedin 1873–1874.

Mercer was born in Fifeshire in 1829. After an apprenticeship as a cabinetmaker, he arrived in Port Chalmers aboard the Philip Laing in 1848. According to an 1848 letter home, Mercer intended for his father and other family to join him. Mercer opened a grocery store on Princes Street in Dunedin, in partnership with George Ross, and then alone, and then with his son Hector. Mercer served seven years on the city council, and was a Justice of the Peace. He was elected mayor of Dunedin in 1873 and served one term.

He died in Dunedin on 6 June 1902.

Mercer's son, also Andrew Mercer, became a politician in England.
