= Andrew Oates =

Australian-British embryologist

Professor Andrew Oates
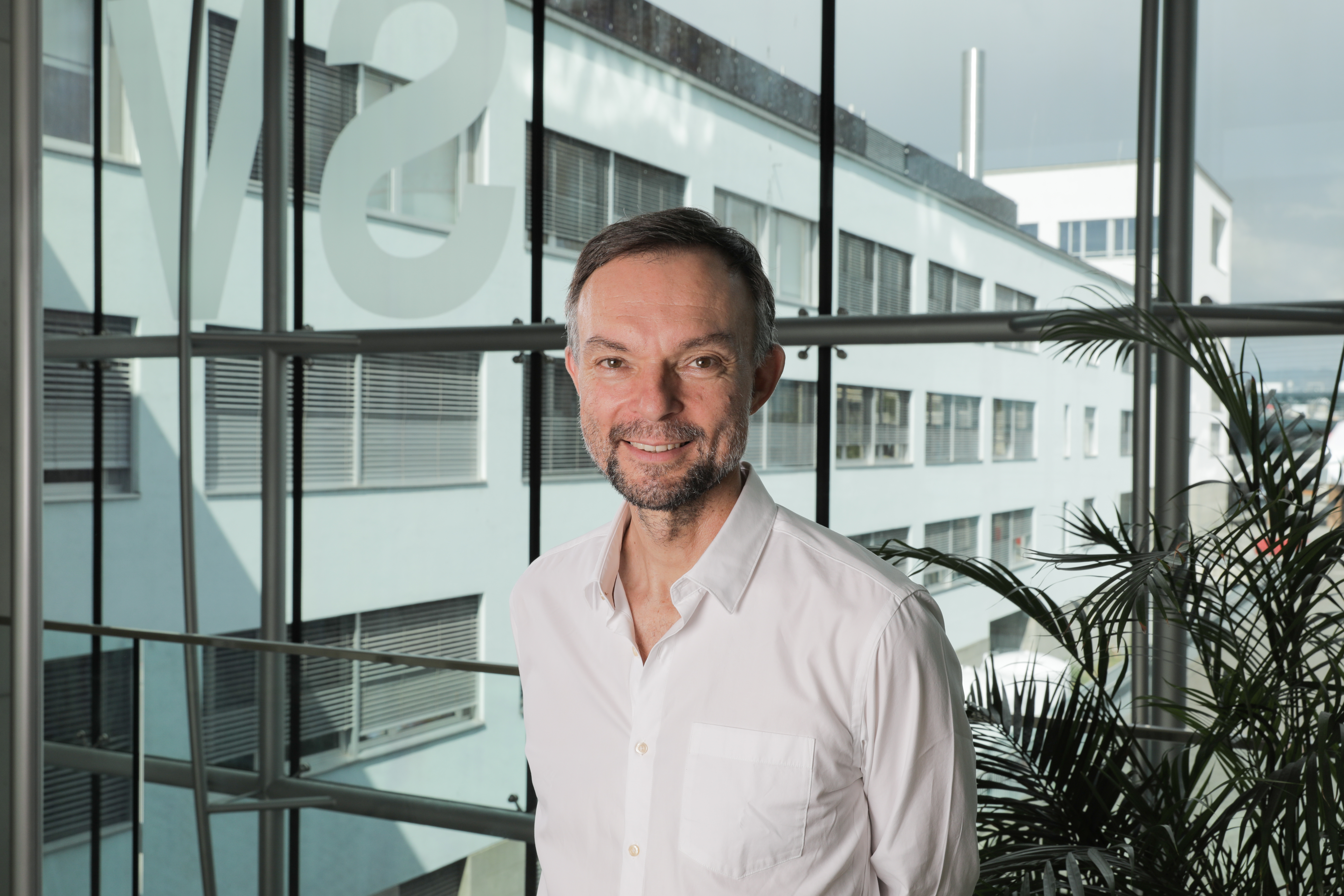
- Andy Oates in 2020
- Born: 1969 (age 56–57); Adelaide, Australia
- Citizenship: Australian; British
- Occupation: Full Professor
- Known for: Segmentation of the zebrafish body axis by the genetic oscillations

Academic background
- Education: Biology
- Alma mater: University of Adelaide; University of Melbourne
- Doctoral advisor: Andrew F Wilks
- Other advisor: Robert Ho

Academic work
- Discipline: Biology
- Sub-discipline: Embryology
- Institutions: EPFL (École Polytechnique Fédérale de Lausanne)
- Main interests: Developmental biology Genetic oscillations Biophysics; Embryology; Synchronization
- Website: https://www.epfl.ch/labs/oateslab/

Andrew 'Andy' Charles Oates (born 1969 in Adelaide, Australia) is an Australian and British developmental biologist and embryologist specialized in biological pattern formation. He is professor at EPFL (École Polytechnique Fédérale de Lausanne) and head of the Segmentation Timing and Dynamics Laboratory at EPFL's School of Life Sciences. Since 2021, he has been dean of EPFL's School of Life Sciences.

== Career ==
Oates received an undergraduate degree in biochemistry with honors for his work at the Robert Saint's laboratory at the University of Adelaide in 1992. He then joined Andrew F. Wilks at the Ludwig Institute for Cancer Research and at the University of Melbourne as PhD student, and graduated in 1998. His postdoctoral time was at the laboratory of Robert Ho both at Princeton University and at University of Chicago, where he began his studies on the segmentation clock in zebrafish. In 2003, he moved to the Max Planck Institute of Molecular Cell Biology and Genetics in Dresden to start his research group. In 2012, he became professor of vertebrate developmental genetics at University College London and moved his group to the National Institute for Medical Research at Mill Hill in London. In April 2015, he became a member of the Francis Crick Institute in London.

In 2016, he joined EPFL as a full professor, where he is the founder and director of the Timing, Oscillation, Patterns Laboratory at EPFL's School of Life Sciences.

Since 2018, he has served as director of the EPFL's Institute of Bioengineering, and since January 2021 he has been the dean of the EPFL's School of Life Sciences.

== Research ==
Oates' research laboratory is composed of biologists, engineers, and physicists. It draws on molecular genetics, quantitative imaging, and theoretical analysis in order to investigate populations of coupled genetic oscillators in vertebrate embryos, termed as segmentation clocks. These systems drive the rhythmic, sequential, and precise formation of embryonic body segments, exhibiting rich spatial and temporal phenomena spanning from molecular to tissue scales.

The laboratory' contributions are the direct connection of genes to segmentation rhythm, and the discovery that the rhythm also involves physical, collective processes at multi-cellular and tissue scales.

== Distinctions ==
Oates is a member of the British Society of Developmental Biology. He is the recipient of the R.K. Mortenson Prize for Biochemistry 1991.

== Selected works ==
- Negrete, Jose; Oates, Andrew C. (2019). "Embryonic lateral inhibition as optical modes: An analytical framework for mesoscopic pattern formation". Physical Review E. 99 (4) 042417. arXiv:1808.09362. Bibcode:2019PhRvE..99d2417N. doi:10.1103/PhysRevE.99.042417. PMID 31108612. S2CID 104644290.
- Lleras Forero, Laura; Narayanan, Rachna; Huitema, Leonie FA; Vanbergen, Maaike; Apschner, Alexander; Peterson-Maduro, Josi; Logister, Ive; Valentin, Guillaume; Morelli, Luis G.; Oates, Andrew C.; Schulte-Merker, Stefan (2018). "Segmentation of the zebrafish axial skeleton relies on notochord sheath cells and not on the segmentation clock". eLife. 7. doi:10.7554/eLife.33843. PMC 5962341. PMID 29624170.
- Richter, Sandra; Schulze, Ulrike; Tomançak, Pavel; Oates, Andrew C. (2017). "Small molecule screen in embryonic zebrafish using modular variations to target segmentation". Nature Communications. 8 (1): 1901. Bibcode:2017NatCo...8.1901R. doi:10.1038/s41467-017-01469-5. PMC 5711842. PMID 29196645.
- Liao, Bo-Kai; Jörg, David J.; Oates, Andrew C. (2016). "Faster embryonic segmentation through elevated Delta-Notch signalling". Nature Communications. 7 11861. Bibcode:2016NatCo...711861L. doi:10.1038/ncomms11861. PMC 4912627. PMID 27302627.
- Webb, Alexis B.; Lengyel, Iván M.; Jörg, David J.; Valentin, Guillaume; Jülicher, Frank; Morelli, Luis G.; Oates, Andrew C. (2016). "Persistence, period and precision of autonomous cellular oscillators from the zebrafish segmentation clock". eLife. 5. doi:10.7554/eLife.08438. PMC 4803185. PMID 26880542.
- Soroldoni, D.; Jorg, D. J.; Morelli, L. G.; Richmond, D. L.; Schindelin, J.; Julicher, F.; Oates, A. C. (2014). "A Doppler effect in embryonic pattern formation". Science. 345 (6193): 222–225. Bibcode:2014Sci...345..222S. doi:10.1126/science.1253089. PMC 7611034. PMID 25013078. S2CID 206556621.
- Bajard, L.; Morelli, L. G.; Ares, S.; Pecreaux, J.; Julicher, F.; Oates, A. C. (2014). "WNT-regulated dynamics of positional information in zebrafish somitogenesis". Development. 141 (6): 1381–1391. doi:10.1242/dev.093435. PMC 3943186. PMID 24595291.
- Schröter, Christian; Ares, Saúl; Morelli, Luis G.; Isakova, Alina; Hens, Korneel; Soroldoni, Daniele; Gajewski, Martin; Jülicher, Frank; Maerkl, Sebastian J.; Deplancke, Bart; Oates, Andrew C. (2012). "Topology and Dynamics of the Zebrafish Segmentation Clock Core Circuit". PLOS Biology. 10 (7) e1001364. doi:10.1371/journal.pbio.1001364. PMC 3404119. PMID 22911291.
