= Andrew Quitmeyer =

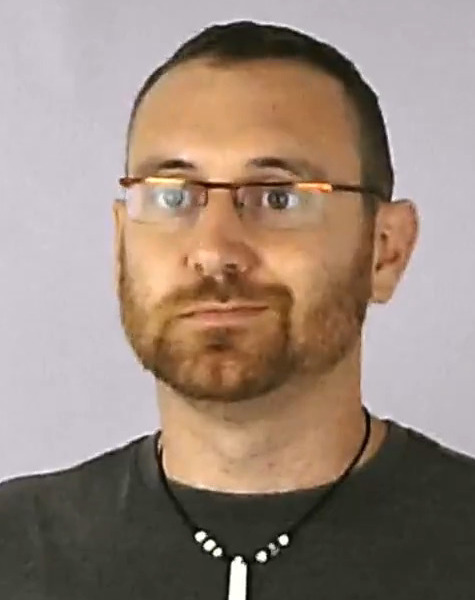

Andrew (Andy) James Quitmeyer is a professor and television personality best known as the host of the survival series Hacking the Wild on the Science Channel. His field of expertise is in his self-defined field of “digital naturalism”. Quitmeyer was a professor in interactive media design at the National University of Singapore but quit his position stating the university was overly concerned with "chasing metrics and chasing the pointless prestige of others." He now runs the Art-Science makerspace "Digital Naturalism Laboratories" in Gamboa, Panama.

From 2015-2016 Quitmeyer served as the American Arts Incubator's “Art Ambassador for the Philippines”, a US State Department and ZERO1 joint-program.

He previously was a co-founder of the Open-Source Sex Toy company, Comingle, which released designs for an open-source electrified condom, and became part of an international intellectual property battle about open-source sex technology involving many other co-defendants such as Kickstarter.
