= Andrew Zydney =

American chemical engineer

Andrew L. Zydney is an American chemical engineer, currently a Distinguished Professor of Chemical Engineering at Pennsylvania State University and an Elected Fellow of the American Association for the Advancement of Science, American Institute for Medical and Biological Engineering and American Institute of Chemical Engineers. Zydney obtained his Ph.D. from the Massachusetts Institute of Technology in Chemical Engineering. Zydney is known for his work in Bioprocessing and Bioseparations. Furthermore, Zydney leads his own research group at Pennsylvania State University conducting industry funded research in membrane science and bioseparations.
