= Andrew Rowell =

British filmmaker (born 1982)

- Born: February 10, 1982 (age 44)
- Occupation: Filmmaker

Andrew Rowell (born 10 February 1982 in Carmarthen, Wales) is a filmmaker. Based in Stoke-on-Trent, United Kingdom, he won an Emmy for his camerawork for NBC on the Beijing 2008 Summer Olympics.

After graduating in 2004 Andrew received notable success winning the 2004 JVC Short Film Award for his production Four of a Kind. Andrew has produced work for BBC, ITV, Channel 4, Channel 5, Sky1 and Sky Sports, as well as producing corporate work for organisations such as JCB, DHL and Vodafone. He was also co-producer of the BAFTA shortlisted Sky1 documentary Ben: Diary of a Heroin Addict.

In October 2010 Andrew travelled with a delegation including James Caan to Pakistan to film villages affected by the floods.
