= Andrew Curnew =

Canadian entrepreneur

- Born: April 26, 1979 (age 47); Toronto, Ontario, Canada
- Education: Osgoode Hall Law School (LLM); Ivey Business School (MBA); Rotman School of Management (ICD)
- Occupation: Social entrepreneur
- Organization: CEO of KI Equity Corp
- Known for: Dental business ventures
- Criminal status: Pardoned
- Spouse: Rita Kilislian
- Relatives: Michael W. Morrissey (WWI)

Andrew Curnew is a Canadian social entrepreneur known for his dental business ventures.

== Biography ==
Curnew was born in Toronto, Ontario. He earned a Master of Laws (LL.M.) in International Business and Regulatory Law from Osgoode Hall Law School at York University, and an Executive MBA from the Ivey Business School at Western University. Curnew completed the Impact Measurement Programme at the Said Business School, University of Oxford. He also completed the Directors Education Program (ICD.D) at the Rotman School of Management and completed certifications at Harvard Business School and the University of Victoria.

In 2003, Curnew was charged with gun possession and dangerous driving. He later claimed that these charges were part of a case of police corruption, supported by former Hell's Angels member turned informant David Atwell's admission in his book. Curnew has been vocal about his belief that he was wrongfully convicted and has taken legal action against his former defense attorney, alleging negligence during his trial. Canadian law allows for expedited record suspensions in cases of proven miscarriages of justice, ensuring that individuals do not suffer further collateral consequences

Following his release from prison, Curnew became financially successful and co-owned a foreign-based automobile dealership, where he met Rita Kilislian, whom he later married in 2009. The couple have one daughter. At their residence in Toronto, they constructed a replica of a Don Jail cell, referencing the facility where Curnew had been detained. The replica cell was featured in the music video for "Family Matters" by Canadian rapper Drake.

== Career ==
Curnew is the CEO of KI Equity Corp, a private investment firm reportedly involved in managing dental clinics and real estate holdings. He co-owns Willowdale Endodontics and Downtown Toronto Dental. He is also linked to properties in Toronto’s upscale Bridle Path neighborhood, including his own mansion featured in high-profile events and media productions.

Curnew previously held leadership roles in the automotive, IT, and consulting sectors, including as COO of CORADIX Technology Consulting and Vice President of AutoForum.

== Media coverage ==
Curnew’s lifestyle has drawn public attention, particularly for lavish events held at his Bridle Path home. In 2016, he hosted an engagement party for Jeremy Bieber, Justin Bieber’s father that included a Bengal tiger, drag performers, and a Ferris wheel. He hosted the filming of "Family Matters" by Drake, where he appeared in a red bandana in a garden scene with the artist.

In 2024, Curnew and Kilislian were involved as defendants in a lawsuit brought by Conrad Black, over the sale of Black's ancestral mansion following his tax issues. Having purchased the property in 2023, Curnew requested the immediate dismissal of the claim while telling Toronto Star that their decision to invest in the property came from a "heartfelt dedication to maintaining the area's esteemed legacy". The lawsuit was ultimately dismissed.

== Philanthropy ==
Curnew has donated to cultural organizations such as Opera Atelier. During one event involving Justin Bieber and other celebrities, he contributed $25,000 to support the group’s work.

In 2023, Curnew and Kilislian sponsored a fundraising event for the Toronto French School (TFS), held at El Mocambo.
