= Andrew of Cornwall =

Andrew of Cornwall (Andreas Cornubiensis, Andreas de Cornubia, André de Cornouailles) (fl. 1290s) was a philosopher at Oxford during the 1290s. He is thought to have introduced Parisian Modism into England, and possibly to have influenced the young Duns Scotus. These conclusions are tentative, since we are almost totally ignorant of the details of Andrew's life, and the dates and location of his activities are not certain.
