= Andrew Brereton =

Welsh writer (1827–1885)

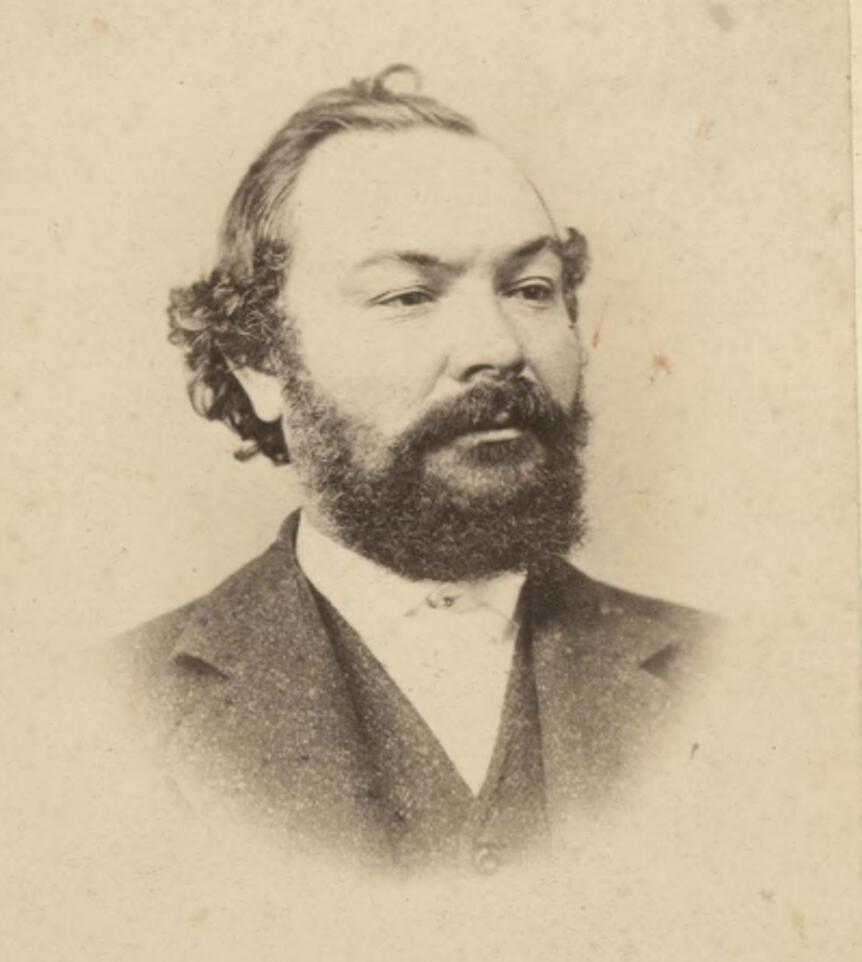
Portrait of Andreas o Vôn (4674316) (cropped)

Andrew Brereton (1827–1885) was a Welsh writer. He was born in Anglesey. He worked in Liverpool for a while, before moving to Mold where he worked as a brewer, and a writer. He submitted to a number of periodicals, and frequently attended Eisteddfodau events.

In 1878 he diverted the money designated to the creation of a national testimonial to him to found a scholarship at University College, Aberystwyth.

He died in 1885.
