= Andrew Mercer (politician) =

New Zealand-born British politician

Andrew Mercer (1859 – 1927) was a New Zealand-born British politician.

Born in Dunedin, Mercer was the son of Andrew Mercer, who later served as Mayor of Dunedin. The younger Mercer became a sailor, and joined the London-based National Amalgamated Sailors' and Firemen's Union, become secretary of its Green's Home branch. He was also elected as treasurer of the Federation of Trades and Labour Unions connected with the Shipping, Carrying, and Other Industries.

At the 1892 London County Council election, Mercer stood as a Labour Progressive candidate in St George. He won the seat, having campaigned for the municipalisation of the London Docks. He devoted much of his time on the council to serving on committees, including the Asylums Committee, the Theatres and Music Halls Committee, and the Stores sub-committee of the London Fire Brigade. In each case, he advocated for the rights of the workers. He lost his seat at the 1895 London County Council election.
