= Andy Davies (musician) =

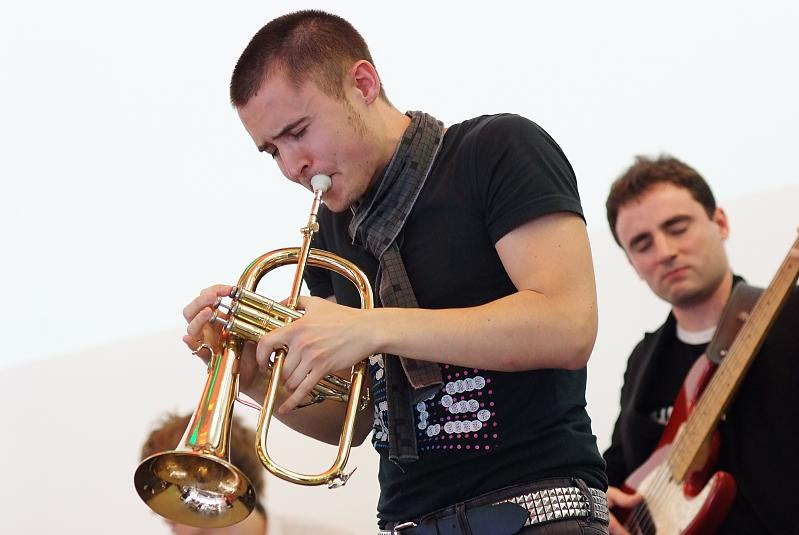
- Andy Davies and Lorenzo Bassignani performing live in 2008.
- Born: 1 February 1981 (age 45); Wales
- Occupations: Musician, voiceover artist
- Years active: 2006–present

Andrew Davies (born 1 February 1981) is a Welsh jazz trumpet player and voiceover artist. At the London Jazz Festival, 2007, he played the role of Chet Baker in the play, "Speedball".

According to Dave Gelly of The Observer, "Andy Davies has a lovely trumpet sound, and in the totally acoustic setting of a small club, it blossoms.". In addition to his musical talents, Davies also provides continuity announcements on digital television channel 5* (previously Fiver) along with Cartoon Network & ITV.
