= Finance & Development =

Journal of the International Monetary Fund

- Discipline: Economics
- Language: English

Publication details
- History: 1964–present
- Publisher: International Monetary Fund
- Frequency: Quarterly

Standard abbreviations
- ISO 4: Finance Dev.

Indexing
- CODEN: FNDVAM
- ISSN: 0145-1707 (print); 1564-5142 (web)
- LCCN: 75648861
- OCLC no.: 884610050

Links
- Journal homepage; Online archive; Pre-1996 issues

Finance & Development is a quarterly journal published by the International Monetary Fund (the IMF).

The journal publishes analysis on issues related to the financial system, monetary policy, economic development, poverty reduction, and other world economic issues.

== Contributors ==
Contributors are both IMF staff and prominent international financial experts and finance academics.

Print and web editions are published quarterly in English, Arabic, Chinese, French, Russian, and Spanish.
