= Andrew Heafitz =

American inventor

Andrew Heafitz is an American inventor. He is the VP of product development at Terrafugia, a company developing a flying car.

== Early life and education ==
Heaftiz grew up in Newton, Massachusetts and attended Newton South High School. He was awarded his first patent when he was 19 for a camera shutter. He was the founder of TacShot, a rocket-propelled camera capable of being quickly launched and deployed to photograph an area from overhead.

Heafitz holds a SB and MS (2000) from MIT.

== Awards and honors ==
In 2003, he was recognized on the MIT Technology Review's TR100 list.

He received the MIT Lemelson Student Inventor prize in 2002.
