= Andrew Salgado =

Canadian artist (born 1982)

- Born: 1982 (age 43–44); Regina, Saskatchewan, Canada
- Known for: painter
- Movement: Contemporary art
- Website: www.andrewsalgado.com

Andrew Salgado (born 1982) is a Canadian artist who works in London and has exhibited his work around the world. His paintings are large-scale works of portraiture that incorporate elements of abstraction and symbolic meaning.

== Biography ==
Andrew Salgado received BFA from University of BC in Vancouver in 2005 and graduated with MFA from Chelsea College of Art & Design in London at 2009.

Salgado was featured in the 2014 documentary Storytelling, which followed him as he created a series of works. In 2013, he was awarded the Emerging Artist Award as part of the Lieutenant Governor's Arts Awards in Saskatchewan.

Andrew Salgado lives and works in London.

== Personal life ==
Andrew Salgado is openly gay. In 2008, he was a victim of homophobic violence, when his partner and he were beaten by eight guys during a music festival in British Columbia.

== Exhibitions ==
- 2013 Andrew Salgado: The Acquaintance, Art Gallery of Regina.
- 2016 The Snake, Beers Gallery, London.
