= StudentCam =

Video documentary competition

- Genre: Documentary filmmaking competition
- Frequency: Annual
- Locations: United States, Guam
- Years active: 2006-present
- Participants: Middle school students (grades 6-8); High school students (grades 9-12)
- Patron: C-SPAN
- Website: StudentCam.org

StudentCam is an annual competition selecting the best video documentaries created by middle and high school students. Each year, StudentCam releases a different prompt about the United States for student filmmakers to respond to in a documentary. It is sponsored by the Cable-Satellite Public Affairs Network's (C-SPAN) Classroom project. All winning documentaries are available to watch on the StudentCam website. The top 25 winners are interviewed for television broadcasts and have their documentaries aired on C-SPAN.

== Overview ==
The aim of the competition, as stated by C-SPAN, is to provide an opportunity for young people to voice their opinions on current events. Middle and high school students can compete alone or in groups of up to three, entering a video documentary between 5 and 6 minutes in length, which presents more than one side to the selected topic and includes related C-SPAN programming. Each year a new theme related to current affairs is provided, and competitors must use this as the basis for their entry. Subjects have ranged from video game violence to illegal immigration.

Eighth-grade students from McKinley Middle Charter School in Racine, Wisconsin discuss their 2010 grand prize-winning video, I’ve Got the Power.

The deadline for entries is in January each year and the StudentCam winners are announced live on C-SPAN's Washington Journal, usually in March each year. Following the announcement, the top 25 entries are shown on C-SPAN, one documentary each weekday morning, accompanied by a telephone interview with the student filmmakers. All of the winning documentaries are available on the StudentCam website. The winning filmmakers receive cash prizes typically totaling $150,000, with the grand prize-winner receiving $5,000, in addition to being featured on C-SPAN. As of 2014, 150 entries each year are chosen as prize-winners, and 11 teacher awards are given to teachers who incorporate the competition into their classes.

The sponsor of the StudentCam competition is C-SPAN Classroom, a free membership organization providing teachers with C-SPAN materials for classes and research. Promotion of the competition is often supplemented by local cable providers.

== History ==
The StudentCam competition developed from a documentary competition called CampaignCam, run by C-SPAN during the 2004 presidential campaign as a way of including students' views about the election. The StudentCam forerunner won a Beacon Award in 2005, conferred by the cable industry for excellence in communications and public affairs.

In 2006, StudentCam was launched by C-SPAN, adding a requirement that students include relevant C-SPAN programming. The 2018 competition received the most entries to date, when over 5,700 students from 46 states and Washington, D.C. submitted a total of 2,985 submissions. The grand prize winner of the 2009 competition, Sawyer Bowman, a 10th grade student from Davidson, North Carolina was congratulated by President Barack Obama via a specially-recorded video message. A first-prize winner in the 2010 competition, Matthew Shimura, met First Lady Michelle Obama at the White House in April 2010 during a town hall meeting for her "Let's Move!" initiative, to talk about fighting childhood obesity, which was the subject of Matthew's video.

=== Grand prize winners ===
Year	Students	Film title
2006	Anthony Hernandez and Dustin Gillard	Anywhere USA
2007	Zach Chastain, Bryan Cink and Ryan Kelly	Jupiter or Bust: The El Sol Solution
2008	Scott Mitchell and Nick Poss	Leaving Religion at the Door
2009	Sawyer Bowman	Cancer. It's Personal
2010	Madison Richards, Samantha Noll and Lauren Nixon	I've Got the Power
2011	Carl Colglazier	The Great Compromise
2012	Matthew Shimura	The Constitution and the Camps: Due Process and the Japanese-American Internment
2013	Josh Stokes	Unemployment in America
2014	Emma Larson, Michaela Capps, and Sarah Highducheck	Earth First, Fracking Second
2015	Anna Gilligan, Katie Demos and Michael Lozovoy	The Artificial Wage
2016	Olivia Hurd	Up to Our Necks
2017	Ava and Mia Lazar	The Tempest-Tossed
2018	Adam Koch and Tyler Cooney	Old Enough to Fight, Old Enough to Vote
2019	Mason Daugherty and Eli Scott	What It Means to Be an American: Citizen Accountability in Government
2020	Jason Lin, Sara Yen and Amar Karoshi	Cmd-delete: Technology’s Damaging Effect on Democracy in 2020
2021	Theodore Poulin	Trust Fall
