= Andrew Johnson (rugby league) =

English rugby league footballer

Playing information
Club
Years	Team	Pld	T	G	FG	P
1963–65	Castleford	12	1	3	9	213

Andrew Johnson is a former professional rugby league footballer who played in the 1960s. He played at club level for Castleford.

== Playing career ==
=== County League appearances ===
Andrew Johnson played in Castleford's victory in the Yorkshire League during the 1964–65 season.
