= Andrew Johnston =

Andrew Johnston may refer to:

- Andrew Johnston (critic) (1968–2008), film and TV critic
- Andrew Johnston (English politician) (1835–1895), Liberal Party Member of Parliament for Southern Essex 1868–1874
- Andrew Johnston (golfer) (born 1989), English golfer
- Andrew Johnston (poet) (born 1963), New Zealand poet
- Andrew Johnston (Scottish politician) (c. 1798 – 1862), Whig Member of Parliament for Anstruther Burghs 1831–1832 and St Andrews Burghs 1832–1837
- Andrew Johnston (singer) (born 1994), British boy soprano
- Andrew Johnston (New Jersey politician) (1694–1762), politician from New Jersey
- Andrew Johnston (footballer) (born 1970), Australian rules footballer
- Andrew Johnston (surgeon) (1770–1833), president of the Royal College of Surgeons in Ireland
- Andrew Johnston (cricketer) (1916–1993), Scottish cricketer
- Andrew Johnston (comedian), Canadian comedian and writer
- Andrew Johnston, a.k.a. Andrew Griswold, Northern Irish musician with The Dangerfields

== See also ==
- Andrew Johnson (disambiguation)
