= Andrew Johnson (Michigan politician) =

American politician

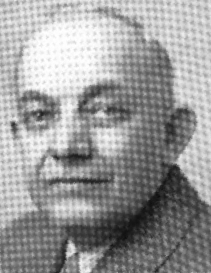

Member of the Michigan House of Representatives from the Wexford district
- In office January 1, 1942 – 1943

Personal details
- Born: September 12, 1889 Kent County, Michigan
- Party: Republican
- Spouse: Garnet Dailey
- Children: 5

Andrew Johnson (born September 12, 1889) was a member of the Michigan House of Representatives who served from 1942 to 1943.

Johnson was born in Kent County, Michigan. Johnson was a Congregationalist. Johnson married Garnet Dailey in 1915. Together, they had five children. Johnson was a newspaper publisher. In 1948, Johnson was the alternate delegate to Republican National Convention from Michigan. In 1950, Johnson was the Benzie County Republican Party chair.
