= Andrew Rushbury =

English footballer (born 1983)

Personal information
- Full name: Andrew James Rushbury
- Date of birth: 7 March 1983 (age 43)
- Place of birth: Carlisle, England
- Position: Midfielder

Team information
- Current team: Belper Town

Youth career
- 1999–2001: Chesterfield

Senior career*
Years	Team	Apps	(Gls)
2000–2004	Chesterfield	40	(1)
2002	→ Matlock Town (loan)		
2004	→ Alfreton Town (loan)	11	(0)
2004	Telford United	10	(0)
2004	Forest Green	3	(0)
2005–2013	Belper Town	382	(49)
- * Club domestic league appearances and goals

Andrew "Andy" Rushbury (born 7 March 1983 in Carlisle) is an English footballer who played as a midfielder in the Football League for Chesterfield. He currently played for Belper Town and is now retired.

== Career ==
Rushbury started his football career as a trainee with Chesterfield in 2000. He made his debut in the 2000–2001 season against Brighton and went on to make two appearances at the end of the 2000–01 campaign, and was given a professional contract in August 2000 and went on to make 40 appearances for Chesterfield scoring 1 goal in the 4–4 draw with Wycombe Wanderers. After spells on loan with Matlock Town he was released by Chesterfield during the 2003–04 season after a loan spell with Alfreton Town making 11 appearances and joined Conference club Telford United. Telford United then liquidated in 2004. After a brief period at Forest Green Rovers he then went on to play for Belper Town making over 350 appearances for the Derbyshire-based Club.

== England Universities ==
Rushbury also played for his university team at Nottingham Trent University from 2006 to 2009 and was selected to represent the England university team for the season 2007 and 2008 season selection squad and was selected to represent the national squad at the world student games.
