= Andrew Mark Davies =

President of Wind Telecomunicazioni Spa

- Born: 1966

Andrew Mark Davies is president of Wind Telecomunicazioni Spa since April the 18th 2014. Formerly Vice President and Chief Financial Officer of Verizon Wireless since November the 15th 2010.

Andrew joined Vodafone in 2003 and held financial positions within the group (CFO, Vodafone Turkey – Finance director, Vodafone Japan – Head of finance for the consumer business unit within Vodafone UK – CFO of Indian operations, Vodafone Essar).

Davies began his career in 1987 at KPMG. He has been Chairman of the Supervisory Boat at Joint Stock Company Kyivstar since February 2015.

== Education ==
Davies graduated with an honors degree in mathematics from London's Imperial College of Science, Technology and Medicine.

== Wind Telecomunicazioni SpA ==
The telecommunications operator provides internet, mobile and fixed-line voice and data products to consumers and corporate clients in Italy. It also provides services such as incoming and outgoing call termination for national and international operators.
