= Sylvia Dwyer =

American painter

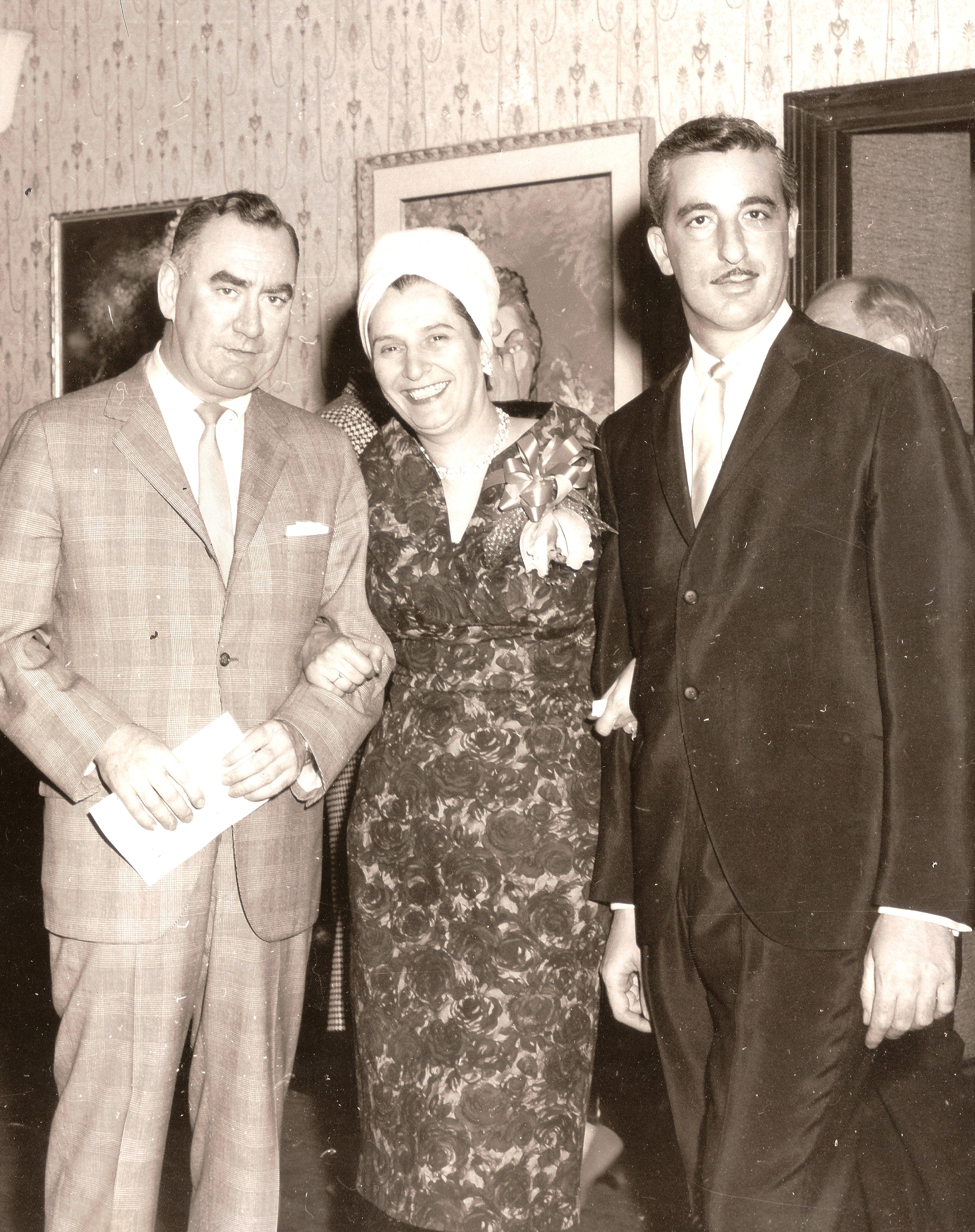
Former governor of New York State, Hugh L. Carey, then congressman Carey, Sylvia Dwyer, and Vincent Vita at opening of art show 2/25/1962.

Sylvia Dwyer (1912–1985) was an expressionist painter, art critic, and the founder and director of the Brooklyn Arts Gallery, the first art gallery in Brooklyn, New York.

== Career ==
Born Sylvia Bernice Feingold in Brooklyn, New York, Dwyer started drawing and painting at age 8. She won a Fine Arts Scholarship to the College of Fine and Applied Arts, Paris, France as a teenager. A charter member of the Artist's League (forerunner of Artist's Equity), she was an artist during the Works Progress Administration (WPA) in the 1930s. As a painter, she was greatly influenced by El Greco and Francisco Goya, as evidenced in her figure drawing and composition. Her work has been exhibited in Greenwich Village, New York; Spoleto, Italy; Warner Library, Tarrytown, New York; Silvermine Guild of Artists; Chautauqua Institute, New York.

A noted expressionist and portrait painter, her work was well received by critics of the time. Starting with exhibitions on the streets of Greenwich Village, she went on to show in many New York galleries, including a two-man show with noted artist Salvatore Tortora. Her last New York exhibit as an artist was held at the Women in the Arts Foundation, Inc. in New York City in 1976.

In 1958, Dwyer founded the Brooklyn Arts Gallery, the first art gallery in Brooklyn, where she discovered such notable artists as Andy Johnson, Vincent Vita, and the rediscovery of August Satre. She was also instrumental in the careers of Mary Fife Laning, Edward Laning, Bill Preston, Jack Katz, and Eugenia Zundel. As a member of the Publicity Club of New York, Inc., she was an art critic and assistant editor for the Long Island Post and other local papers.

Due to the fact that the Brooklyn Arts Gallery's first location was inside a professional building, Dwyer was at the center of the controversy of the Is Art a Profession? court case in 1959. She is also credited for recognizing that an innovative technique, the Gemmaux Process invented by Jean Crotti, had been used to create the stained glass windows in the Our Lady of Lebanon Maronite Cathedral (Brooklyn), prompting church leaders to bring the ten windows with them when they relocated.

She continued to be a patron of the arts and an advocate for the role of arts in a healthy community throughout her life.

== Personal life ==
In June 1947, she met and married Thomas Francis Dwyer, a leading political figure and labor negotiator in Brooklyn, New York. Mr. Dwyer ran for Sheriff on the Communist Party ticket and was very active in working for the labor council in New York. Mr. Dwyer died in a car accident in 1958, the same year that the Brooklyn Arts Gallery was founded. Diagnosed with Parkinson’s disease in 1979, Dwyer was no longer able to paint and her subsequent ill health caused Dwyer to move to California in 1982 to be near her daughter.

She died from pneumonia at age 73, on the eve of the opening of her final exhibition as an artist, on February 9, 1985. This exhibit was a two-woman show with her daughter at the Unitarian Center, 1187 Franklin St. San Francisco.
