= Andrew Brokos =

American poker player (born 1982)

- Nicknames: foucault82 (PokerStars) urbandb888 (Full Tilt Poker)
- Born: 1982 (age 43–44)

World Series of Poker
- Bracelet: None
- Final table: None
- Money finishes: 12
- Highest WSOP Main Event finish: 35, 2008

Andrew Brokos (born 1982) is a professional poker player, instructor, author and coach who is well known for finishing in the money in the World Series of Poker (WSOP) main event five times in the first six years he played the event, including three top 100 finishes. He is a poker instructor for Card Player Pro. He is the founder of the Boston Debate League, which coordinates debate programs in Boston area high schools and has pledged to donate 10 percent of his WSOP winnings to the organization. WSOP.com lists him as being from Baltimore, but other sources list him as being from Boston.

== Online poker ==
Brokos's largest online victory was in the 946-player $2,000 + $100 2010 Full Tilt Online Poker Series XVI No-limit Hold'em Event 25 for a prize of $450,000. He has also earned $117,984 for a third-place finish in the 1066-player $500 + $30 2010 World Championship of Online Poker No-limit Hold'em with Rebuys Event 55.

== World Series of Poker ==
Brokos has a total of twelve World Series of Poker in the money finishes, five in the WSOP Main Event. In 2008, 2010, and 2011, he finished in the top 100 of very large field main events: 35th in the $10,000 6,844-player 2008 WSOP main event for a prize of $193,000; 87th in the $10,000 7,319-player 2010 WSOP main event for a prize of $79,806; and 53rd in the $10,000 6,865-player 2011 WSOP main event for a prize of $160,036.

World Series of Poker results
Year	Cashes	Final Tables	Bracelets
2006	1		
2007	1		
2008	1		
2010	1		
2011	1		
2013	1		
2015	1		
2016	1		
2017	4		
2018	4		
