= Andrew Mercer (poet) =

Scottish poet and topographer

Andrew Mercer (1775–1842) was a Scottish poet and topographer.

== Life ==
Mercer was born in Selkirk. Destined for the ministry of the Secession Church by his family, in 1790 he entered the University of Edinburgh. Ultimately he gave up theology, studied the fine arts, and tried unsuccessfully to make a living in Edinburgh as a miniature-painter and man of letters. He was acquainted with John Leyden and Alexander Murray.

Settling in Dunfermline, Mercer lived by teaching and by drawing patterns for the damask manufacturers. In later life he suffered money troubles. He died at Dunfermline, 11 June 1842.

== Works ==
Mercer's major work was a History of Dunfermline from the earliest Records (Dunfermline, 1828). There was also published under his name a Historical and Chronological Table of the Ancient Town of Dunfermline from 1064 to 1834: an abridgment of a manuscript by Ebenezer Henderson, Annals of Dunfermline from the earliest Records to 1833. He was the author of a poem on Dunfermline Abbey (Dunfermline, 1819), and a volume of verse, Summer Months among the Mountains (Edinburgh, 1838).

Mercer wrote both in prose and verse for Blackwood's Edinburgh Magazine and The Scots Magazine. He edited the North British Magazine during its existence of two years (or 13 months) from January 1804.

== Notes ==
Attribution

This article incorporates text from a publication now in the public domain: Lee, Sidney, ed. (1894). "Mercer, Andrew". Dictionary of National Biography. Vol. 37. London: Smith, Elder & Co.
