= Andy Robinson (design manager) =

Andy Robinson is a curator and arts manager. His focus is art in the public realm. In 2007 he co-founded futuresystemsprojects – an architecture group with Maia Damianovic.

He has led interdisciplinary cultural programmes across art, architecture and science working with partners such as Goldsmiths College University of London, Anglia Ruskin University, Cambridge University and NESTA (National Endowment for Science, Technology and the Arts), including a 5-year public art commissioning programme on the Greenwich Peninsula in London.
