= Maia Damianovic =

British-American art critic, curator (born 1976)

Maia Damianovic (born 1976) is a British American writer of art critical texts, magazine articles, exhibition catalogs, artist monograms and art reviews.

== Early life and education ==
Damianovic was born in southern England, but grew up in Philadelphia, Pennsylvania. She attended the University of Toronto and studied art and culture at the École des Beaux-Arts of Paris-Sorbonne University.

== Career ==
Damianovic has worked as an independent curator of large-scale projects for institutions such as the Smithsonian (1996), Kunstraum Innsbruck (2000, 2006), Frame Programme of the 49th Venice Biennale (2001), the AR/GE Kunst Galerie Museum in Bolzano, Italy (2002), Steirischer Herbst Festival, Austria (2002), Brandts Klædefabrik, Odense, Denmark (2006), and the Lentos Museum of Contemporary Art, Linz, Austria.

Her projects are usually presented in public and off-site locations. She specializes in situational and performative interactions, and enactments.

She co-founded Future Systems Projects with Andy Robinson in 2007, and currently works in the company as an architectural designer.
