= Andrew Painter =

Andrew Painter may refer to:

- Andrew Painter (baseball) (born 2003), American baseball pitcher
- Andrew Painter (tennis) (born 1975), Australian tennis player
