= Andrew of Carniola =

Andrew of Carniola (1399 – November 13, 1484) was a Roman Catholic archbishop from Carniola, in present-day Slovenia.

Andrew of Carniola was a Dominican friar. In 1476, through the aid of Emperor Frederick III, he became bishop of Carniola and lived at Laibach. He was an advocate of a general council of bishops as head of the Catholic church, rather than the Papacy.

He attempted but failed to be appointed Cardinal in 1478 by the Pope. In 1482, he traveled to Switzerland and attempted to convene a general council of bishops. As a result, he was excommunicated by the Pope and held in prison. He died during his incarceration, allegedly through suicide.
