= Andy (given name) =

- Gender: Unisex
- Language: English, Bahasa Indonesia

Origin
- Languages: English, Indonesian

Other names
- Related names: Aniket, Ander, Andrey, Andis, Andrea, Andres, Anders, Anderson, Andreas, Alexander

Andy, also spelled Andye, Andee, or Andi, is predominantly a diminutive version of the male given name Andrew, and variants of it such as Andreas, Andrés, and Andrei. The form of the variation is based on the Scottish "-ie" diminutive ending. Andrew is derived from the Greek name Andreas, meaning "manlike" or "brave". Andy is also occasionally used as a diminutive for the male and female given name Andrea.

Andy is also recognized as a hypocoristic for the English name Alexander (and its variants). This usage, though less common than for Andrew, is etymologically justified by the fact that Andrew and Alexander are cognates, both deriving from the ancient Greek root anḗr (ἀνήρ), meaning “man” or “male.”

As a masculine name, it can also be a variant of Anthony (especially Andon, Andoni, Andonis, Andonios, Andoniaina & Andony). Andy can also be a feminine given name as an alternate form of Andrea. The Indian names Anand and Anindya are also sometimes shortened to Andy.

In Indonesia, Andi is also a common first name, shortened from the word Adinda, used to address siblings respectfully, or from the Old Javanese word meaning "servant". It is also a title in South Sulawesi nobility (primarily Bugis, though have cognates in other Austronesian languages) for educated noble. Andi as a title in Bugis can be used for both male and female, but can only be inherited patrilineally.

== People ==
=== In arts and entertainment ===
- Andy Adler, American sportscaster and journalist
- Andy Allo (born 1989), American singer-songwriter
- Adda Husted Andersen (1898–1990), Danish American metalsmith and enameler nicknamed "Andy"
- Andy Bell (musician) (born 1970), formerly of Ride, Hurricane #1 and Oasis
- Andy Bell (singer) (born 1964), English singer with Erasure
- Andy Biersack (born 1990), lead vocalist of American rock band Black Veil Brides (also known as Andy Black and Andy Sixx)
- Andy Borg (born 1960), Austrian singer and television presenter
- Andy Borodow (born 1969), Canadian wrestler
- Andy Buckley (born 1965), American actor
- Andy Chambers (born 1966), English author and game designer
- Andy Cohen (born 1968), American TV producer, author and TV and radio host
- Andi Deris (born 1964), German singer and songwriter, lead singer of the power metal band Helloween
- Andy Detwiler (1969–2022), American farmer and internet personality
- Andy Devine (1905–1977), American actor
- Andy Dick (born 1965), American actor and comedian
- Andi Dorfman, former Bachelorette
- Andy Eastwood, English ukulele player and performer
- Andi Eigenmann (born 1990), Filipina actress and model
- Andy Erikson (born 1987), American stand-up comedian
- Andy Everson (born 1972), First Nations artist from British Columbia
- Andy Fraser (1952–2015), English bassist and songwriter, member of the rock band Free
- Andy Fletcher (musician), British keyboardist, member of Depeche Mode
- Andy García (born 1956), Cuban-American actor
- Andy Gibb (1958–1988), English singer and songwriter
- Andy Gill (1956–2020), English musician, member of the rock band Gang of Four
- Andy Grammer, American singer, songwriter and record producer
- Andy Griffith (1926–2012), American actor
- Andy Heyward (born 1949), American television producer, president of DIC Entertainment
- Andy Hollingworth, British photographer
- Andy Hurley, drummer of American band Fall Out Boy
- Andy Kaufman (1949–1984), American comedian
- Andy Lakey (1959–2012), American artist
- Andy Lassner (born 1966), Colombian-American television producer
- Andy Lau, Hong Kong singer and actor
- Andy Lee (comedian), Australian comedian and radio presenter
- Andy Lee (German musician), German rock and roll pianist
- Andy Lee (Korean singer), South Korean singer and actor, member of Shinhwa
- Andy Lewis, American slackliner
- Andy Lin, American photographer
- Andie MacDowell (born 1958), American actress
- Andy Marino (born 1980), American writer
- Andy McCoy, Finnish musician
- Andy Mckee, fingerstyle acoustic guitar player
- Andy McNab (born 1959), British soldier-turned-novelist
- Andy McQuade, British film director
- Andy Milonakis, American comedian
- Andy Morin, American producer and musician with Death Grips
- Andy On (born 1977), American actor and martial artist
- Andi Osho (born 1973), British actress and television presenter
- Andi Peters (born 1970), British television presenter
- Andy Hyman (born 1981), American playwright
- Andy Prieboy (born 1955), American musician
- Andy Richter, American comic
- Andy Rooney, American television personality
- Andy Rozdilsky, American clown
- Andy Samberg (born 1978), American comedian and actor
- Andy Serkis, English actor
- Andi Soraya, Indonesian actress
- Andy Summers, English musician with the Police
- Andy Taylor, English musician with Duran Duran
- Andy R. Thomson (born 1971), Canadian architect
- Andy Upton, Australian singer-songwriter
- Andy Warhol (1928–1987), American artist
- Andy Warpigs (died 2021), American singer-songwriter
- Andy Whitfield (1974–2011), Welsh-Australian actor
- Andy Williams (1927–2012), American singer
- Andi Zeisler, American journalist and writer
- Andy, one of the pseudonyms of Finnish singer Irwin Goodman (1943–1991)

=== In sports ===
- Andy Bathgate (born 1932), Canadian ice hockey player
- Andy Bell (boxer) (born 1985), British boxer
- Andy Bell (footballer, born 1956), English footballer
- Andy Bell (footballer, born 1984), English footballer
- Andy Bell (freestyle motocross rider) (born 1975), former freestyle motocross rider
- Andy Bell (Scottish footballer)
- Andy Bloom (athlete) (born 1973), American Olympic shot putter
- Andy Bowen (1867–1894), American boxer known for fighting the longest boxing match in history
- Andy Caddick, English cricketer
- Andy Canzanello (born 1981), American ice hockey player
- Andy Carrington (born 1936), English footballer
- Andy Cohen (baseball) (1904–1988), Major League Baseball second baseman and coach
- Andy Cole, English footballer
- Andy Curran (born 1898), English footballer
- Andy Dibble (born 1965), Welsh footballer and coach
- Andy Dickerson (born 1982), American football coach and former player
- Andy Dickerson (offensive lineman, born 1963) (born 1963), American football player
- Andy Gayle (born 1970), former English footballer
- Andy Gruenebaum (born 1982), American soccer player
- Andy Grundy, Former rugby league footballer
- Andy Heck, American football player and coach
- Andi Herzog (born 1968), Austrian football manager
- Andy Hill (born c. 1950), American basketball player, TV executive, author, and speaker
- Andy Hug (1964–2000), Swiss karateka and kickboxer
- Andy Isabella (born 1997), American football player
- Andy Johnson (English footballer), English footballer
- Andy Johnson (Welsh footballer), Welsh footballer
- Andy Leavine (born 1987), American retired professional wrestler
- Andy Lee (American football) (born 1982), American football punter
- Andy Lee (boxer) (born 1984), Irish boxer
- Andy Lee (footballer, born 1982), English footballer for Bradford City
- Andy Lee (footballer, born 1962), English footballer for Tranmere Rovers
- Andy Lee (snooker player) (born 1980), Hong Kong snooker player
- Andy Leung (born 1990), Hong Kong windsurfer
- Andy Macdonald, American professional skateboarder
- Andy McDonald, Canadian ice hockey player
- Andy Mangan (born 1986), English footballer
- Andy McQuarrie (born 1939), former Scottish footballer
- Andy Messersmith, baseball player
- Andy Mulliner (born 1971), English-born Welsh footballer
- Andi Murez (born 1992), Israeli-American Olympic swimmer for Israel
- Andy Murray (born 1987), Scottish tennis player
- Andy Najar, Honduran footballer
- Andy Nicholls, English football hooligan and author
- Andy Pettitte, American baseball player
- Andy Phillip, American basketball player
- Andy Phillips (baseball), American baseball player
- Andy Phillips (center) (born 1991), American football center
- Andy Priaulx, British racing driver
- Andy Ram (born 1980), Israeli tennis player
- Andy Reid, Super Bowl-winning NFL coach
- Andy Ristie (born 1982), Surinamese kickboxer
- Andy Ritchie (English footballer) (born 1960), English footballer and manager
- Andy Ritchie (Scottish footballer) (born 1956), Scottish footballer
- Andy Ritchie (swimmer) (born 1958), Canadian swimmer
- Andy Robustelli, American football player
- Andy Roddick (born 1982), American professional tennis player
- Andy Sabados (1916–2004), American football player
- Andy Schleck (born 1985), Luxembourgish cyclist
- Andy Schliebener (born 1962), Canadian ice hockey player
- Andy Selva (born 1976), Sammarinese footballer
- Andy Sheets, American baseball player
- Andy Shore (born 1955), former English footballer
- Andy Sokol (born c. 1928), Canadian football player
- Andy Sonnanstine, American baseball player
- Andy Soucek (born 1985), Spanish auto racing driver
- Andy Stewart (born 1978), former Scottish footballer
- Andy Tait, Scottish footballer
- Andy Van Vliet (born 1995), Belgian basketball player
- Andy Whing (born 1984), English footballer
- Andy Yerzy (born 1998), Canadian baseball player

=== Politicians ===
- Andi Alfian Mallarangeng, former Indonesian Minister of Youth and Sports
- Andy Barr (born 1973), American politician
- Andy Beshear (born 1977), American attorney and politician
- Andy Burnham (born 1970), British politician, Prime Minister of the United Kingdom and former Mayor of Greater Manchester
- Andy Kerr (born 1955), American environmentalist
- Andy Kerr (born 1962), Scottish politician
- Andy Kim (born 1982), American politician and diplomat
- Andy MacNae (born 1965), British politician
- Andi Meister (born 1938), Estonian engineer and politician
- Andy Rachmianto (born 1965), Indonesian government official

=== Other ===
- Andi Abdullah Bau Massepe, Bugis nobleman and Indonesian national hero
- Andy Bathie, British sperm donor
- Andy Bell (entrepreneur), AJ Bell Chief Executive
- Andy Bell (journalist) (born 1963), British journalist
- Andy Byford (born 1965), British public transportation executive
- Andy Griffiths, an Australian children's writer
- Andy Karsner (born 1967), American technology entrepreneur
- Andy Liu (born 1946 or 1947), Canadian mathematician
- Andi Mappanyukki, 32th Sultan of Bone and 4th Regent of Bone
- Andy Vesey (born 1955), American businessman

== Fictional characters ==
- Andy Barclay, from the Childs Play horror movie series
- Andy Bernard, from the American television show The Office
- Andy Bogard, from the Fatal Fury video games series
- Andy Botwin, from the Showtime series Weeds
- The title character of Andy Capp, an English comic strip
- Andy Davidson (Torchwood), from the British television series Torchwood
- Andy Davis (Toy Story), from the Toy Story animated film series
- Andy Dufresne, from the 1994 drama film The Shawshank Redemption
- Andy Dwyer, from the American television series Parks and Recreation
- Andy Fox (FoxTrot), from the comic strip FoxTrot
- Andy Hardy, protagonist of 16 films from 1937 to 1946, played by Mickey Rooney
- Andy Hargrove, from the television series One Tree Hill
- Andy Johnson (Squirrel Boy), from the animated television series Squirrel Boy
- Andy Kewzer, from the movie The Final Destination
- Andy Larkin (What's with Andy), from the Canadian animated television series What's with Andy?
- Andy Lippincott, the first gay character in comics
- Andy McNally (Rookie Blue), from the television series Rookie Blue
- Andy Millman, the lead character in the television series Extras
- Andy Mouse, figure created by American artist Keith Haring in 1985 and 1986.
- Andy Panda in classic cartoons
- Andy Pandy, from children's television
- Andy Pipkin, from the British comedy series Little Britain
- Andi Prendergast, from the television series Reaper
- Andy Renko, from the television series Hill Street Blues
- Andy Sipowicz, from the television series NYPD Blue
- Andy Stitzer, the main character from the 2005 American romantic comedy movie The 40-Year-Old Virgin
- Andy Trudeau, from the television series Charmed
- Andy Taylor, from the American television show The Andy Griffith Show
- Andie Walsh, the main character of the film Pretty in Pink
- Andy (Peanuts), one of Snoopy's siblings from the comic strip Peanuts
- Raggedy Andy, brother of Raggedy Ann
- Andie, a red squirrel from the The Nut Job and The Nut Job 2: Nutty by Nature

== See also ==
- Andy (disambiguation)
- Andi (disambiguation)
- Andoy (given name), a Philippine variant of Andy
