= Laki (disambiguation) =

Laki is a volcanic fissure in the south of Iceland.

Laki may also refer to:

== Places ==
=== Azerbaijan ===
- Läki or Orta Ləki, a village and municipality

=== Bulgaria ===
- Laki, Blagoevgrad Province, village in Blagoevgrad Province, Bulgaria
- Laki, Plovdiv Province, a town in Plovdiv Province, Bulgaria
  - Laki Municipality, a municipality in Plovdiv Province, Bulgaria
- Laki Peak, Graham Land, Antarctica

=== North Macedonia ===
- Laki, Vinica, a village in Vinica Municipality

=== Poland ===
- Łąki, Lower Silesian Voivodeship in south-west Poland
- Łąki, Lublin Voivodeship in east Poland
- Łąki, Garwolin County in Masovian Voivodeship, east-central Poland
- Łąki, Warsaw West County in Masovian Voivodeship, east-central Poland
- Łąki, Wołomin County in Masovian Voivodeship, east-central Poland
- Łąki, West Pomeranian Voivodeship in north-west Poland

== Other uses ==
- Laki tribe, a Kurdish tribe native to southwestern Iran
- Laki language, a Kurdish dialect
- Laki (Mazandarani dialect)
- Laki Tasi (born 2003), American football defensive tackle
- Laki (One Piece), a minor character in One Piece

== See also ==
- Lackey (disambiguation)
- Łąki (disambiguation)
- Lakki (disambiguation)
- Ləki or Lyaki, Azerbaijan
- Zay people or Laqi, an ethnic group
