= Andrew Bell =

Andrew Bell may refer to:

- Andrew Bell (artist) (born 1978), British-born American toy designer
- Andrew Bell (engraver) (1726–1809), Scottish co-founder of the Encyclopædia Britannica
- Andrew Bell (educationalist) (1753–1832), Scottish pioneer of mutual instruction and author of the Madras System of Education
- Andrew Bell (cricketer) (born 1982), English former cricketer
- Andrew Bell (journalist) (fl. 1827–1863), Scottish-born Canadian journalist
- Andrew Bell (minister) (1803–1856), Presbyterian minister in Upper Canada
- Andrew Bell (moderator) (c. 1795–1861), minister of the Church of Scotland
- Andrew Bell (judge) (born 1966), Australian judge
- Andrew J. Bell Jr. (1907–2000), African American business owner and civil rights activist
- Jamie Bell (Andrew James Matfin Bell) (born 1986), English actor and dancer.

== See also ==
- Andy Bell (disambiguation)
