= Łąki =

Łąki (meaning "meadows") may refer to:

- Łąki, Lower Silesian Voivodeship (south-west Poland)
- Łąki, West Pomeranian Voivodeship (north-west Poland)
- Łąki, Lublin Voivodeship (east Poland)
- Łąki, Garwolin County in Masovian Voivodeship (east-central Poland)
- Łąki, Warsaw West County in Masovian Voivodeship (east-central Poland)
- Łąki, Wołomin County in Masovian Voivodeship (east-central Poland)

== See also ==
- Laki (disambiguation)
- Louky nad Olší (Łąki nad Olzą), a village in the Czech Republic
