= Lackey (surname) =

Lackey is a surname.

People bearing it include:

- Andrew Lackey (1983–2013), American convicted murderer
- Bob Lackey (1949–2002), American basketball player
- Brad Lackey (born 1953), American motocross racer
- Brenda Bakken-Lackey (fl. 1999–2006), Canadian politician serving in the Saskatchewan legislative assembly
- Douglas P. Lackey (fl. since 1970s), American philosopher and playwright
- Edwin Lackey (1930–1993), Canadian Anglican bishop
- Elsie Wattie Lackey (1901–1992), American bacteriologist
- Gavin Lackey (born 1968), Australian modern pentathlete
- Jane Lackey (born 1948), American visual artist
- Jennifer Lackey (born c. 1970s), American professor of philosophy
- John Lackey (born 1978), American baseball pitcher for the Chicago Cubs
- John Lackey (politician) (1830–1903), New South Wales politician and magistrate
- Kaysie Lackey (born 1981), American food artist
- Ken Lackey (born 1943), American businessman and politician from Oklahoma
- Lisa Lackey (born 1971), Australian actress
- Mercedes Lackey (born 1950), American fantasy author
- Robert Lackey (American football) (fl. 1891), American football coach
- Robert T. Lackey (born 1944), Canadian born fisheries scientist
- Ryan Lackey (born 1979), American entrepreneur and computer security professional
- Stephen N. Lackey (born 1980), American public affairs advisor, philanthropist and political fundraiser
- Tamara Lackey, American photographer
- Tom Lackey (born 1959), American politician, serving in the California state legislature
- William Lackey (1870–1941), American baseball pitcher for the Philadelphia Athletics

== See also ==
- Lacey (disambiguation), including surnames
- Lakey, a surname
