= Andy Bell =

Andy Bell may refer to:

- Andy Bell (entrepreneur), AJ Bell Chief Executive
- Andy Bell (boxer) (born 1985), British professional boxer
- Andy Bell (footballer, born 1910), Scottish footballer, see List of Bury F.C. players
- Andy Bell (footballer, born 1956), English footballer
- Andy Bell (footballer, born 1984), English footballer
- Andy Bell (freestyle motocross rider) (born 1975), Canadian freestyle motocross rider
- Andy Bell (journalist) (born 1963), British journalist
- Andy Bell (music producer) of Hudson Records
- Andy Bell (singer) (born 1964), English singer with synth pop band Erasure
- Andy Bell (Scottish footballer)
- Andy Bell (Welsh musician) (born 1970), British musician with Ride and Oasis, formerly of Hurricane #1 and Beady Eye

== See also ==
- Andrew Bell (disambiguation)
- Andy Bull, Australian alt-pop singer-songwriter and record producer
