= Lackey =

Lackey may refer to:

== Places ==
- Lackey, Kentucky, United States, an unincorporated community
- Lackey, Mississippi, United States, an unincorporated community
- Lackey, Virginia, United States, an unincorporated community
- Lackey Ridge, Antarctica

== Historic American buildings ==
- George W. Lackey House, a historic house in Mountain View, Arkansas
- John Alexander Lackey House, a historic house in Burke County, North Carolina
- Lackey General Merchandise and Warehouse, a historic commercial building in Mountain View, Arkansas

== Other uses ==
- Lackey (surname)
- Lackey (manservant), a uniformed domestic worker
- "Lackey" (song), by the English indie rock band The Others
- Henry E. Lackey High School, a school in Charles County, Maryland
- Lackey Field, a former baseball and athletics field at Appalachian State University
- Lackey moth, a species of moth, Malacosoma neustria

== See also ==
- Lacey (disambiguation)
- Lakey, a surname
- Laki (disambiguation)
- Łąki (disambiguation)
- Lakki (disambiguation)
