= Andy Lee =

Andy Lee may refer to:

== Sportspeople ==
- Andy Lee (American football) (born 1982), American football punter
- Andy Lee (boxer) (born 1984), Irish boxer
- Andy Lee (footballer, born 1982), English footballer for Bradford City
- Andy Lee (footballer, born 1962), English footballer for Tranmere Rovers
- Andy Lee (snooker player) (born 1980), Hong Kong snooker player

== Musicians ==
- Andy Lee (South Korean singer) (born 1981), South Korean singer and actor
- Andy Lee (German musician), German rock 'n' roll pianist

== Others ==
- Andy Lee (comedian) (born 1981), Australian comedian
- Andy Lee, a character in the musical 42nd Street

== See also ==
- Andy Newton-Lee, British actor
- Andy Scott-Lee (born 1980), Welsh pop singer
