= Andy Marino =

Andy Marino may refer to:

- Andy Marino (British writer), British biographer
- Andy Marino (American writer) (born 1980), American writer of young-adult fiction
