= Lakey =

Lakey is a surname. Notable people with the surname include:

- Alice Lakey (1857–1935), Activist in the pure food movement
- Andy Lakey (1959–2012), American artist
- Claude R. Lakey (1910–1990), American saxophonist, trumpeter, and arranger
- George Lakey (born 1937), Activist, sociologist, and writer
- John and Laura Lakey, Artists whose work have appeared in role-playing games
- Leanne Lakey (born 1978), British actress, played Belinda Peacock in EastEnders
- Thomas Lakey (1874–1932), English professional footballer
- Todd Lakey, American politician from Portland, Oregon
- Lakey Peterson (born 1994), American surfer ranked #1 by the World Surf League

== See also ==
- Lackey (disambiguation)
- Lakhey
- Leakey (surname)
