= Andy Lin =

American Photographer

Andy Lin is an American esports player of Big Buck Hunter and professional photographer based in New York City.

== The Self-Portrait Project ==
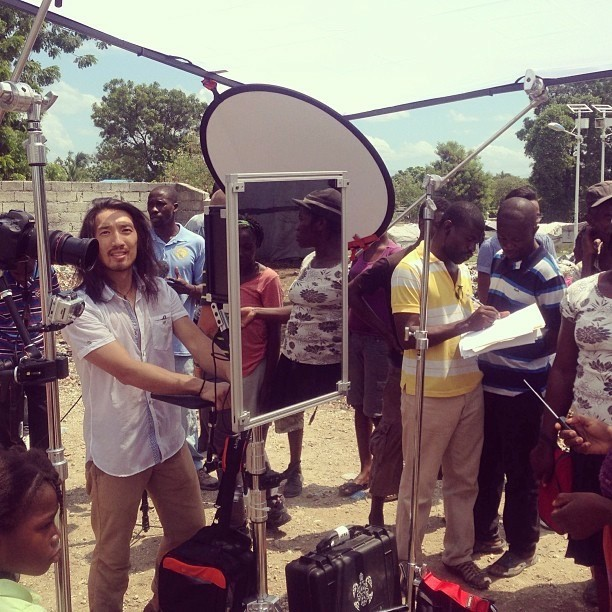
Andy Lin in field, Haiti, Camp Grace (Aug. 2014), with the Self Portrait Project, where hundreds of internally displaced people were living since the 2010 earthquakes.

In 2009, Lin founded The Self-Portrait Project (SPP), a photo-based, interactive archive project. Most notably, Lin has taken SPP to Haiti to promote advocacy and awareness of the nation's ongoing housing crisis. According to Lin, the self-portrait mechanism in SPP is influenced by the belief that decisions are best made by the people directly affected by them.

== Photography ==
Andy Lin is a social change photographer. In 2007 Lin co-founded Other Worlds, a non-profit that disseminated images and information about alternative economies and social movements around the world, with Gustavo Castro Soto and Beverly Bell. He also served as a photo editor for the street art quarterly founded by IO Wright, Overspray Magazine. As a travel photographer, he published photos in National Geographic Traveler, including a prize-winner in 2005. In 2006, he documented the Zapatista movement in Chiapas, Mexico for Punk Planet, titled "Zapatista Dreams."

== Big Buck Hunter ==
Nicknamed “The Big Buck Ninja,” Andy Lin is a veteran player of the competitive arcade game Big Buck Hunter. His nickname derives from his calm game-play and longevity in the sport. Lin is the only player to have competed at every World Championship since the inaugural tournament in 2008, except for in 2011, due to a Hurricane Irene related mishap. In 2010, he beat high profile Buck Hunter Travis Pastrana and placed a career-high 5th in both Big Buck Hunter Pro and Big Buck Safari. He placed 21st at the 2019 World Championship in Las Vegas, where he also debuted a custom installation of his Self-Portrait Project, fashioned out of an old Big Buck game unit.
