= William Wiley =

William Wiley may refer to:

- William Wiley (editor) (fl. 1930s), American civil rights activist and newspaper editor
- William H. Wiley (1842–1945), U.S. Representative from New Jersey
- William T. Wiley (1937–2021), American contemporary artist
- Bill Wiley (William D. Wiley, born 1971), American politician
- USS Wiley, a United States Navy destroyer, named after sailor William Wiley

== See also ==
- William Wyllie (disambiguation)
