= Andrew Tait =

Andrew Tait or Andy Tait may refer to:

- Andrew Tait (organist) (c. 1710–1778), Scottish organist, church musician, composer, and music educator
- Andrew Tait (priest) (fl. 1870s–1900s), Irish priest
- Andy Tait (fl. 1940s–1950s), Scottish football player
