= Wattier =

Wattier is a surname. Notable people with the surname include:

- Eugène Wattier (1914–1974), French weightlifter
- Johanna Wattier (1762–1827), Dutch actress

== See also ==
- Wattie
