= Lackie =

Surname list

Lackie is a surname. Notable people with the surname include:

- Darren Lackie, drummer for We Were Promised Jetpacks, a Scottish indie rock band
- Ethel Lackie (1907–1979), American Olympic swimmer
- Mark Lackie (born 1967), Canadian short track speed skater

== See also ==
- Lackey (disambiguation)
