= Andy Curran =

Andy Curran may refer to:

- Andy Curran (footballer) (1898–?), English footballer
- Andy Curran (musician), Canadian rock musician
