= Olive F. Wiley =

AfricanAmerican civil rights activist

Olive F. Wiley (née Thomas) (July 12, 1902 - July 1993) was an African American civil rights activist and education administrator born in Warwick, Rhode Island. Wiley was a founder and president of the Mt. Hope Day Care (now Mount Hope YMCA Child Care Center). She met her husband William Wiley (editor), in Providence, Rhode Island in 1921, and they were married in 1925.

In 1985, Olive and William Wiley were jointly inducted into the Rhode Island Heritage Hall of Fame.

Her son was civil rights activist George Alvin Wiley, and her granddaughter is civil rights activist Maya Wiley.
