= Wattie =

Wattie or Watty is a masculine given name or nickname, often a diminutive form of Walter, and a surname. It may refer to:

== Given name or nickname ==
- Walter Aitkenhead (1887–1966), Scottish footballer
- Walter Watty Allan (1868–1943), Scottish footballer
- Walter Wattie Buchan (born 1957), Scottish punk rock lead vocalist and musician
- Derrick Watty Burnett (born 1950), Jamaican reggae vocalist and musician
- William Watson Watty Clark (1902–1972), American Major League Baseball pitcher
- Wattie Cooper (fl. 1927), New Zealand footballer
- Wharton Wattie Davies (1873–1961), Welsh rugby union and rugby league footballer
- Peter Watt Wattie Dick (1927—2012), Scottish footballer
- Walter Wattie Dunphy (1896–1972), Irish hurler
- Walter Watty Friend (1898–c. 1983), Australian rugby union player
- Roscoe Wattie Holm (1901–1950), American Major League Baseball player
- Walter Wattie Jackson, Scottish footballer in the 1920s
- Walter Watty Keay (1871–1943), Scottish footballer
- Wyatt Watty Lee (1879–1936), American Major League Baseball outfielder and pitcher
- Watson Watty Moore (1925–1967), English footballer
- Walter Watty Shirlaw (born 1902), Scottish footballer
- George Walter Watty Wallace (1900–1964), Australian politician
- Bill Watkins (1858–1937), sometimes known as "Wattie" or "Watty", Canadian-born Major League Baseball player, manager, executive and team owner
- Craig Watson (triathlete) (born 1971), New Zealand triathlete
- Walter Wattie Wilson (1879–1926), Scottish footballer

== Pen name ==
- Watty Piper, a pen name of Arnold Munk, author of the best-known version of the children's story The Little Engine That Could

== Surname ==
- Elsie Wattie Lackey (1901–1992), American bacteriologist
- Harry Wattie (1893–1916), Scottish footballer
- James Wattie (1902–1974), New Zealand company manager, industrialist, philanthropist and race-horse owner, founder of Wattie's
- John Wattie, Episcopalian Dean of Aberdeen and Orkney from 1948 to 1953
- Nora Wattie (1900–1994), Scottish public health medicine and ante-natal pioneer

=== In fiction ===
- Bessie Watty and Mrs. Watty, characters in the play The Corn Is Green and its 1945 film adaptation

== See also ==
- Watty, a nickname for the city of Watford, England
- Wattie's, an American-owned food processing company in the New Zealand market
- Goodman Fielder Wattie Book Awards, presented from 1968 to 1993
- Wat (given name), another short form of Walter
- George McWattie (1875–?), Scottish footballer
- Watty Awards, a writing competition on Wattpad
