= William Wyllie =

William Wyllie may refer to:

- William Morrison Wyllie (c. 1820–1895), an English painter of coastal and maritime themes
- William Lionel Wyllie (1851–1931), son of William Morrison Wyllie, a prolific English painter of maritime themes
- William Wyllie (British Army officer) (1802–1891), Indian army officer
- William Hutt Curzon Wyllie (1848–1909), Indian army officer, later an official of the British Indian Government

== See also ==
- William Wiley (disambiguation)
