= Harry Bell (footballer, born 1924) =

English footballer

Personal information
- Full name: Henry Davey Bell
- Date of birth: 14 October 1924
- Place of birth: Castletown, County Durham, England
- Date of death: 22 April 2014 (aged 89)
- Place of death: Newcastle upon Tyne, Northumberland, England
- Position: Wing half

Senior career*
| Years | Team | Apps | (Gls) |
| – | Hylton Colliery Welfare | | |
| 1946–1955 | Middlesbrough | 290 | (9) |
| 1955–1959 | Darlington | 126 | (19) |
| – | Spennymoor United | | |

Managerial career
- –: Spennymoor United
- * Club domestic league appearances and goals

Henry Davey "Harry" Bell (14 October 1924 – 22 April 2014) was an English professional footballer, born in Castletown, County Durham, who made more than 400 appearances in the Football League playing as a wing half for Middlesbrough and Darlington. He went on to manage Spennymoor United, taking the club from the first qualifying round of the 1963–64 FA Amateur Cup to the fourth round proper. Bell had a long cricket career with Durham County Cricket Club playing in the Minor Counties Championship.

His nephew Norman Bell played professional football for Wolverhampton Wanderers and Blackburn Rovers in the 1970s and 1980s.
