= William Wiley (editor) =

American newspaper editor and civil rights activist

William D. Wiley was a civil rights activist and newspaper editor who worked in Providence, Rhode Island. Wiley edited and published the Providence Chronicle, the only black newspaper in Rhode Island in its time. He co-founded and served as president of the Providence Urban League.

Wiley was born in South Carolina and moved to Providence to live with his father and his second wife (servant of the prominent Rhode Island family, the Chafees) when his mother died. Wiley was editor of his high school newspaper. He could not afford college and joined the Navy in 1918, working as a mess attendant before being promoted to the level of steward. When he returned from service in 1919, he worked for the Imperial Printing and Finishing Company. He met his wife, Olive F. Wiley, in 1921, and they were married in 1925. Wiley worked briefly as the editor of religious publication The Burning Bush in Wisconsin, and he trained to be a minister in the late 1920s. In the 1930s, the Wileys returned to Providence. There, Wiley began editing the Providence Chronicle, and became one of the founding members of the Providence Urban League along with Andrew J. Bell.

In 1985 Olive and William Wiley were jointly inducted into the Rhode Island Heritage Hall of Fame.

His son was the civil rights activist George Alvin Wiley, and his granddaughter is the civil rights activist Maya Wiley.
