= Robert Bell (Canadian geologist) =

Canadian geologist, professor and civil servant

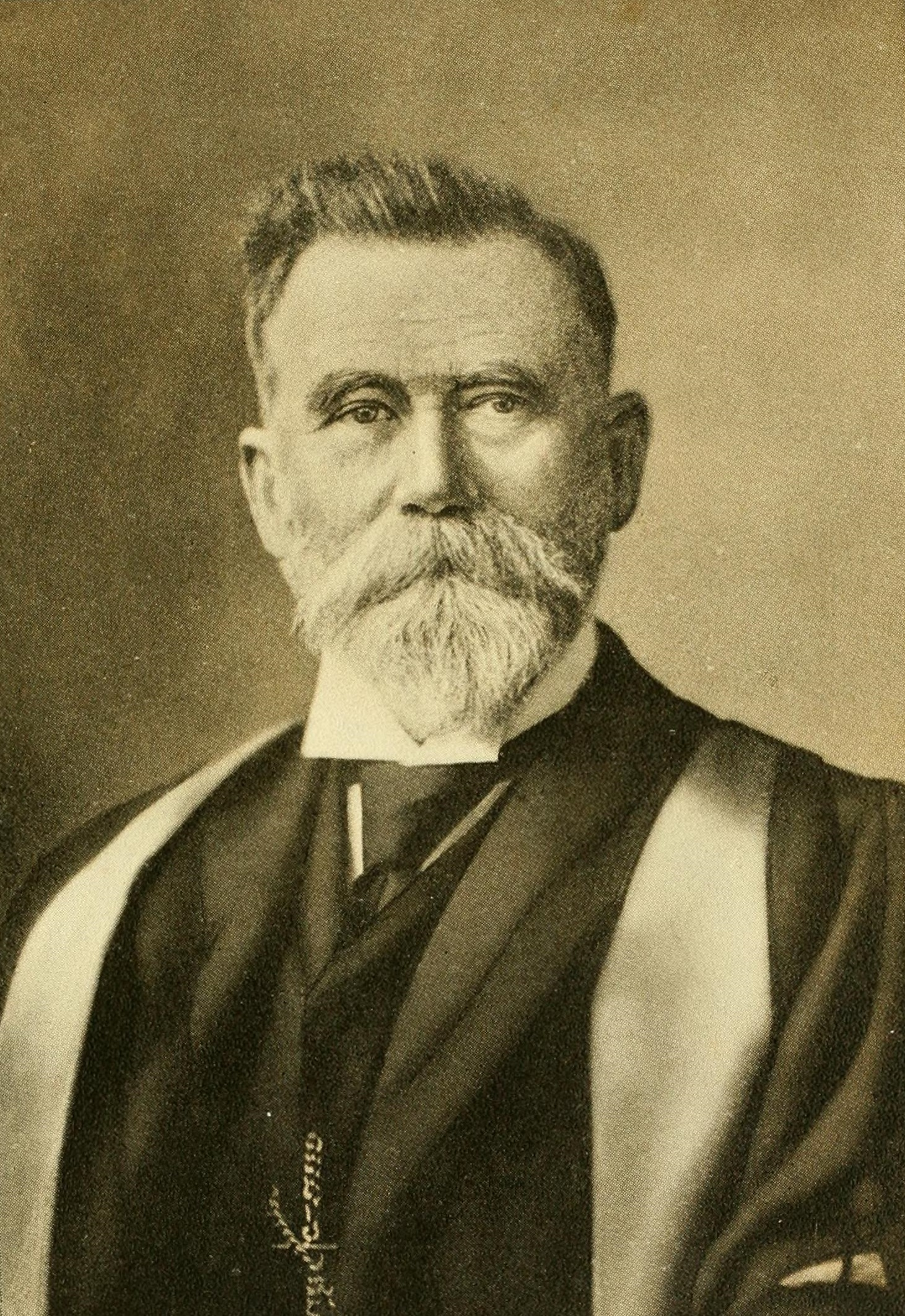
- Born: June 3, 1841; Toronto, Canada West
- Died: June 18, 1917 (aged 76); Portage la Prairie, Manitoba, Canada
- Education: McGill University; University of Edinburgh
- Known for: named over 3,000 geographical features
- Awards: King's Gold Medal of the Royal Geographical Society of London; Cullum Geographical Medal of the American Geographical Society of New York
- Scientific career
- Fields: Geology
- Workplaces: Geological Survey of Canada

Signature
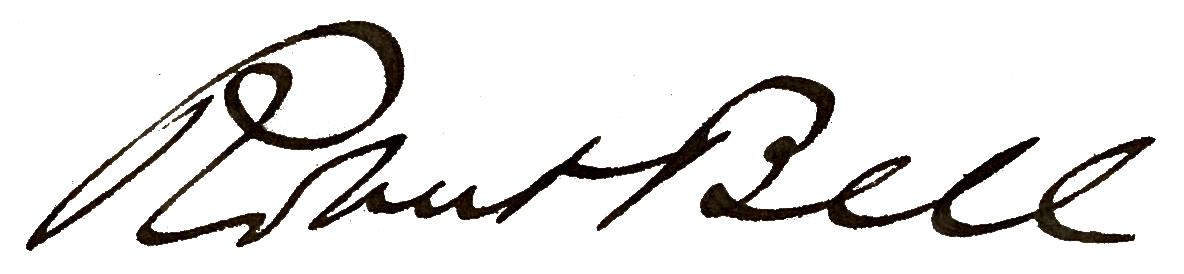

Robert Bell ISO FRSC (June 3, 1841 – June 18, 1917) was a Canadian geologist, professor and civil servant. He is considered one of Canada’s greatest exploring scientists, having named over 3,000 geographical features.

== Personal life ==
Robert Bell was born in Toronto, Canada West to Presbyterian clergy and amateur geologist, Reverend Andrew Bell and Elizabeth Notman. In 1873, Bell married Agnes Smith. They had a son and three daughters. He spent his retirement at his home in Ottawa and his farm in Rathwell, Manitoba. Bell died after a brief illness at the age of 76 at his farm.

== Early beginnings ==
In 1856, at the age of 15 years old, Bell worked as a summer assistant to William Edmond Logan with the Geological Survey of Canada (GSC). Even as he started postsecondary education, he continued to work summers with the GSC, heading his own survey party in 1859.

Bell attended McGill University, Montreal, and studied under John William Dawson. In 1861, Bell earned a civil engineering degree with the Governor General’s Medal. He went on to study for two years at the University of Edinburgh. In 1878, he earned a medical degree from McGill University.

== Career ==
In 1863, Bell became a chemistry and natural sciences professor at Queen’s College in Kingston, Ontario. He continued to do fieldwork for the GSC over the summers. In 1867, he left Queen’s to join the GSC full-time.

In 1869, the GSC made Bell a permanent officer, and he spent the rest of his career there. He was promoted to Assistant Director (1877), Chief Geologist (1890), then Acting Director (1901-1906). He was saddened that he was never appointed Director of the Survey. In November 1908, Bell retired.

During his 52-year career at the GSC, Bell led many extensive explorations in northern Quebec, Ontario, Manitoba, the eastern Arctic, Saskatchewan prairies and the Athabasca oil sands. He is credited with mapping the rivers between Hudson Bay and Lake Superior.

As was the case with all GSC geologists of the time, Bell collected specimens and made notes on geology, flora and fauna, indigenous populations, climate and soil and exploitable resources. His GSC colleagues dubbed him the father of Canadian place-names because he is credited with naming over 3,000 geographical features in Canada. Bell wrote over 200 reports and papers, mostly on geology, biology, geography and ethnology. During his lifetime, he saw his extensive body of fieldwork put to a significant purpose. The planners of the third trans-continental railway, the Grand Trunk Pacific, were able to use the vast compendium of information in Bell's reports as the preliminary reconnaissance work required to plan the track route from Quebec to Winnipeg.

== Private library ==
Bell assembled a private library estimated to contain 26 tons of books and artifacts to support his life’s work. The collection contained rock specimens and hundreds of books on various subjects ranging from natural history texts, medical texts, geological reports, native language and culture texts and books on the exploration of North America. It also contained research and professional periodicals, several Canadian newspapers and several hundred reprints of scientific and professional reports from other researchers.

On October 28, 1962, some of this collection was damaged or destroyed in a fire in Ottawa. Subsequently, the surviving collection was dispersed to family, private collectors and institutions. Some of his archives are held at McGill University in the Osler Library of the History of Medicine but the majority went to the National Archives of Canada

== Awards ==
- 1865 Elected a Fellow of the Geological Society of London
- 1882 Elected a charter-member of the Royal Society of Canada
- 1883 received an honorary LLD from Queen's University, Kingston, Canada
- 1897 Elected a Fellow of the Royal Society of London
- 1902 Received an honorary D.Sc. degree from the University of Cambridge in May 1902.
- 1903 Made a companion of the Imperial Service Order
- 1906 Awarded the Patron's Medal of the Royal Geographical Society of London
- 1906 Awarded the Cullum Geographical Medal of the American Geographical Society of New York.
- Received an honorary DSc degree from McGill University
