= Rex Ballard =

American cinematographer

Rex Ballard is a cinematographer with a career in movies, music videos and television programs. Ballard served for seven years as the Principal Cinematographer of ABC's Extreme Makeover: Home Edition, and is currently the Director of Photography for the program.

With more than 30 years of experience in television entertainment, Ballard has traveled the world working on a variety of projects including documentaries for National Geographic Channel and The History Channel, and camera work for television programs such as Nanny 911, Kid Nation, Matlock and The Merv Griffin Show. Ballard has also been behind the camera for music videos by artists including Tony Bennett, B. B. King, The Neville Brothers and The Pointer Sisters, and has developed commercials and features for most major national broadcast networks and many national brands.

Ballard is also an innovator, inventing a special camera crane for filming inside operating rooms as part of his 30 years of work with Medtronic, filming surgeries used to educate individuals in the medical profession. The crane he developed allows surgeons to teach as they are operating on the patient without the filming process obstructing the view or surgical work in any way. In the early 1980s, Ballard also helped design, build and manufacture The Barber Baby Boom, a 100% mechanical jib arm that was the first of its kind in the industry. Additionally, Ballard designed a movable jib base specifically to address the challenges of filming on construction locations for ABC's Extreme Makeover: Home Edition. Engineered with special tires so the jib base can be moved from location to location and he later went on to develop a motorized version of the jib base to make set-up and movement even easier that has been used in recent seasons of the program.

== Selected credits ==
Year	Title	Role	Notes
2003	Modern Marvels	Camera operator	
2006–2010	Extreme Makeover: Home Edition	Camera operator	Credited on multiple episodes, e.g. "The Swenson-Lee Family" (2007).
2013–2024	The Great Christmas Light Fight	Jib operator	
2014	It Takes a Church	Jib operator	
2015	My Big Fat Fabulous Life	Camera operator	
2016	Billion Dollar Wreck	Jib operator	
2020	Fortune Feimster: Sweet & Salty	Jib operator	

== Other projects ==
In 2010, Ballard oversaw production of Inside Contemporary Children's Photography,a DVD produced as a collaboration between photographer Tamara Lackey's studio and Ballard Productions. At the time, Lackey's studio noted that Ballard's work on Extreme Makeover: Home Edition kept him traveling for much of the year.
