= Norman Bell =

English footballer

Personal information
- Date of birth: 16 November 1955 (age 70)
- Place of birth: Sunderland, England
- Position: Striker

Youth career
- 1971–1975: Wolverhampton Wanderers

Senior career*
| Years | Team | Apps | (Gls) |
| 1975–1981 | Wolverhampton Wanderers | 80 | (17) |
| 1980 | → New England Tea Men (loan) | 18 | (3) |
| 1981–1984 | Blackburn Rovers | 61 | (10) |
- Darwen

Managerial career
- Darwen (player-manager)
- * Club domestic league appearances and goals

Norman Bell (born 16 November 1955) is an English former footballer, born in Hylton Castle, Sunderland, who played in the Football League for Wolverhampton Wanderers and Blackburn Rovers. He also played in the NASL for New England Tea Men.

== Career ==
Bell began his career at Wolverhampton Wanderers as an apprentice in 1971, and turned professional in 1973. He made his senior debut for the club on 23 September 1975 in a goalless draw with Aston Villa, but appeared only a handful of times in that season, which ended in relegation from the First Division.

Overlooked for the club's 1976–77 promotion campaign, he returned to the fold in the following season. With John Richards sidelined, Bell played regularly in the 1978–79 season, until breaking his leg in an FA Cup tie at Crystal Palace in February 1979. As a result of the injury and the addition of Andy Gray to the Molineux attack, Bell next featured in the first team more than a year later, in March 1980, when Wolves fielded a weakened side a few days before the League Cup Final. He found it hard to gain regular football and eventually left to join Blackburn Rovers in November 1981. In total, he scored 24 goals in 100 games for Wolves.

He stayed with Rovers for two-and-a-half seasons in the Second Division before moving into non-league football as player-manager of Darwen.

Since retiring from football Bell had various sales-related jobs before working with young offenders for Blackburn with Darwen Council. Bell's son Andy also became a professional footballer, and his uncle Harry Bell played in the Football League in the 1940s and 1950s.
