= Lakki =

Lakki may refer to:

== Places ==
- Lakki, Chabahar, Iran
- Lakki Marwat, Khyber Pakhtunkhwa province, Pakistan
- Lakki, Leros, Greece
- Lakkoi, or Lakki, Crete, Greece
- Latchi, or Lakki, Polis, Cyprus
- Lakki hills, Sindh, Pakistan

== Other uses ==
- Lakki (film), a 1992 Norwegian film

== See also ==
- Laki (disambiguation)
