= Sulfur bacteria =

Sulfur bacteria may refer to:

- Green sulfur bacteria
- Purple sulfur bacteria
- Sulfate-reducing bacteria
- Sulfur-reducing bacteria
