= Andy Marino (British writer) =

British writer

Andy Marino is a British writer. He is the author of Narendra Modi; A Political Biography, published by HarperCollins. His biography on Modi is remarkable because he was "the only foreigner known to have unfettered access to Mr. Modi". A book review published on the website of CNN-IBN said, "Marino’s book is indeed no hagiography; neither is it coldly objective. It warms up to Modi but is not dazzled by him". Andy Marino has previously written two other biographies: A Quiet American, about Varian Fry, and Herschel: The Boy Who Started World War Two about Herschel Grynszpan.
