= Andy Upton =

- Born: Australia
- Origin: Adelaide, South Australia, Australia
- Genres: Pop music
- Occupation: Singer
- Years active: 1976-1978, 2000 – present
- Labels: Wizard Records

Andy Upton is an Australian singer-songwriter from Adelaide, South Australia. In 1976 and 1977, Upton released three singles, all of which peaked within the top 100 on the Australian Kent Music Report. Upton wrote and was the original singer of Here's Humphrey theme.

Upton later began working for 5KA as a jingle writer during the 1980s.

He returned to performing in 2000 after some years away from the music scene, performing in and around Australia. He performed with the Adelaide-based band The Boys, as their frontman, during a December 2018 event, Jim Slade's Baby Boomers Rock Adelaide.

== Discography ==
=== Singles ===
Title	Year	Peak chart positions	Catalogue
Title	Year	AUS	Catalogue
"Rainbow World"/"Michael"	1976	73	Wizard ZS 146
"It Took Me Years"/"Born in a Taxi"	1976	87	Wizard ZS 164
"Stop! In the Name of Love"/"Born in a Taxi"	1977	54	Wizard ZS 175
