= Andy Bathie =

British sperm doner

Andy Bathie is a sperm donor who was sued for child support in the United Kingdom.

Bathie is from Enfield in the United Kingdom and worked as a fireman. He became a private sperm donor to a lesbian couple. He was later pursued by the Child Support Agency for maintenance payments, and ordered to pay. His case is significant because it was a test case for private sperm donors, and was widely reported in the media.
