= Andy Warpigs =

American singer-songwriter

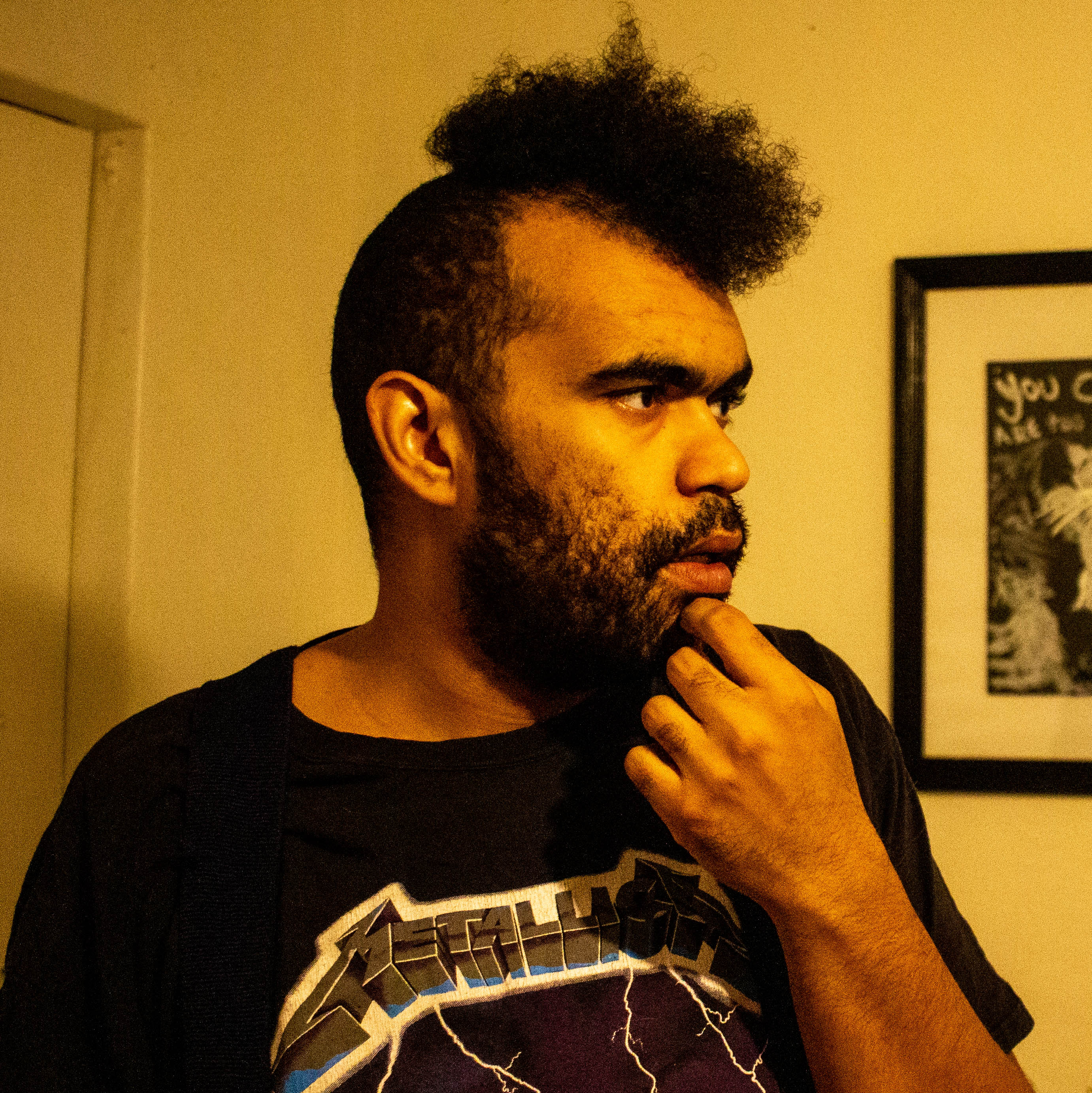
- Andy Warpigs, 2018

Background information
- Born: Phoenix, Arizona
- Died: 30 May 2021 (aged 32)
- Genres: Folk punk
- Occupation: Singer-songwriter
- Years active: 2013–2021

Andy Warpigs was a singer/songwriter from Phoenix, Arizona. They were known for their sarcastic folk punk style, their signature travel guitar, and for playing unconventional venues and spaces as well as being a figurehead in the national DIY scene. Warpigs starred as Dr. Frank-n-Furter in the stage production of The Rocky Horror Picture Show at the Firehouse ArtSpace in Phoenix, Arizona. Warpigs died of an apparent overdose on May 30, 2021, at the age of 32.

== Career ==
Warpigs began performing in 2013 at Phoenix and Tempe venues such as "Lawn Gnome Publishing" and "Long Wong's Dining." Their first few shows were events that grew out of Phoenix Comicon, playing for crowds waiting in line for Free Comic Book Day. Warpig's biggest show of 2013 came when they opened for Pat the Bunny of Tucson folk-punk outfit Ramshackle Glory at a benefit concert at the now closed Aside of Heart in downtown Phoenix. Warpigs had gained a backing band by early 2014, also named "Andy Warpigs", which they explain by saying "It's the same crap that Alice Cooper has been pulling for decades."

Warpigs released their debut album "Folk Punk Yourself" on February 11, 2014, on 56th street records. The album features the singles "Drown My Baby," "STFU," and "N bombs and C Bombs," the video for Drown my Baby was rated one of the "5 Must See Music Videos" by the Phoenix New Times, and has received over 3,583 views as of August 15, 2015. The Phoenix New Times declared Warpig's song "Love is a Stabbing Pain in the Dick" the "Best Love Song By a Phoenix Band" on February 14, 2014. The Phoenix New Times listed Warpigs as one of the "14 Local Bands/Artists You Need To Hear in 2015".

Celebrating their friendly personality and positive demeanor, YabYum West declared Warpigs to be Phoenix Arizona's "Miss Congeniality" on January 1, 2015. On April 11, 2015, Warpigs performed at the 2nd Annual TrunkSpace Indie 500, headlined by Kimya Dawson. Between 29 and 30 May 2015 Warpigs starred as Frank N Furter in the Firehouse's live action Rocky Horror Show.

== Personal life ==
Warpigs was gender-fluid, and used they/them pronouns. They died of an apparent overdose at age 32 on May 30, 2021.

== Discography ==
- Folk Punk Yourself (2014)
- Counter-Culture Shock (2017)
