= Andi Meister =

Estonian road engineer and politician (1938–2025)

Andi Meister (17 November 1938 – 16 August 2025) was an Estonian road engineer and politician.

In 1992–1995 he was Minister of Roads and Communications.

Meister died on 16 August 2025, at the age of 86.
