= Andy Canzanello =

American ice hockey player

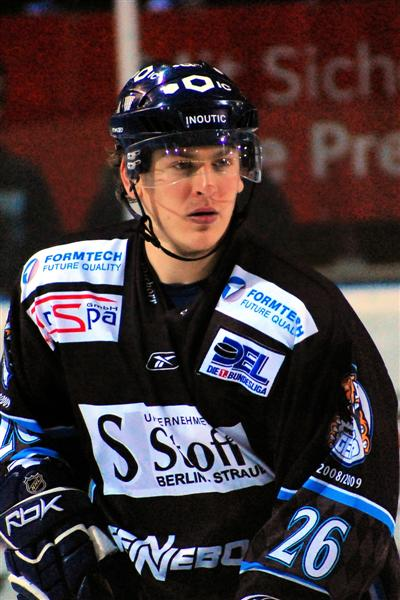
- Canzanello in 2009
- Born: December 1, 1981 (age 43); Rochester, MN, USA
- Height: 5 ft 11 in (180 cm)
- Weight: 192 lb (87 kg; 13 st 10 lb)
- Position: Defense
- Shot: Left
- Played for: Cincinnati Mighty Ducks; Syracuse Crunch; Straubing Tigers; HC Valpellice
- NHL draft: Undrafted
- Playing career: 2004–2020

Andy Canzanello (born December 1, 1981) is an American former professional ice hockey defenseman.

Undrafted after a four-year collegiate career with Colorado College in the Western Collegiate Hockey Association, Canzanello signed an entry-level contract with the Mighty Ducks of Anaheim in 2004. After three seasons within the Ducks organization, Canzanello opted to pursue a European career, in agreeing to a contract with German club, Straubing Tigers of the Deutsche Eishockey Liga.

As a stalwart on defense for the Tigers, Canzanello remained with the team for 8 consecutive seasons. After the 2014–15 season, a second successive season without the playoffs, Canzanello left the Tigers as a free agent and signed for the 2015–16 season in Austria with Villacher EC of the EBEL on March 4, 2015. Canzanello left VSV before the beginning of the season to transfer to the Italian Serie A with HC Valpellice.

== Career statistics ==
			Regular season					Playoffs
Season	Team	League	GP	G	A	Pts	PIM	GP	G	A	Pts	PIM
2000–01	Colorado College	NCAA	37	3	9	12	26	—	—	—	—	—
2001–02	Colorado College	NCAA	37	3	13	16	38	—	—	—	—	—
2002–03	Colorado College	NCAA	40	4	26	30	47	—	—	—	—	—
2003–04	Colorado College	NCAA	39	5	22	27	57	—	—	—	—	—
2004–05	Cincinnati Mighty Ducks	AHL	22	0	5	5	32	—	—	—	—	—
2004–05	San Diego Gulls	ECHL	43	4	16	20	59	—	—	—	—	—
2005–06	Syracuse Crunch	AHL	65	10	15	25	94	2	0	0	0	2
2006–07	Syracuse Crunch	AHL	66	4	20	24	84	—	—	—	—	—
2007–08	Straubing Tigers	DEL	52	4	13	17	73	—	—	—	—	—
2008–09	Straubing Tigers	DEL	51	5	16	21	94	—	—	—	—	—
2009–10	Straubing Tigers	DEL	55	6	25	31	74	—	—	—	—	—
2010–11	Straubing Tigers	DEL	50	9	9	18	76	—	—	—	—	—
2011–12	Straubing Tigers	DEL	52	8	24	32	107	8	0	4	4	2
2012–13	Straubing Tigers	DEL	30	4	10	14	57	7	0	3	3	6
2013–14	Straubing Tigers	DEL	34	1	6	7	38	—	—	—	—	—
2014–15	Straubing Tigers	DEL	52	4	9	13	42	—	—	—	—	—
2004–05	HC Valpellice	Italy	31	4	4	8	28	7	2	3	5	2
2016–17	Vail Yeti	MWHL	26	5	23	28	0	—	—	—	—	—
2017–18	Vail Yeti	MWHL	16	5	6	11	7	—	—	—	—	—
2018–19	Vail Yeti	MWHL	14	4	10	14	0	—	—	—	—	—
2019–20	Vail Yeti	MWHL	11	2	5	7	0	—	—	—	—	—
AHL totals			153	14	40	54	210	2	0	0	0	2
DEL totals			376	41	112	153	561	15	0	7	7	8
