= Andrew Bell (minister) =

English-Canadian minister and geologist (1803-1856)

Andrew Bell (5 September 1803 – 27 September 1856) was a Presbyterian minister who was born in London, England, moved to Scotland and emigrated to Upper Canada with his family in 1817.

Bell and his family settled at Perth where his father was a minister. He studied under his father until 1823 and then pursued divinity courses in Scotland. He returned to Upper Canada in 1826, his formal studies not completed.

Bell had a successful career within the Presbyterian Church. However, some of his most important contributions to Canada came through his hobby, geology. He served on an advisory committee of the Legislative Assembly of Upper Canada where he helped shape the work of the Geological Survey of Canada and, more particularly, the work of William Edmond Logan, who had helped establish that body. His son, Robert Bell, became the director of the survey at a later date.
