= Tamara Lackey =

American photographer

Tamara Lackey is a professional photographer, speaker, author and program host from Chapel Hill, North Carolina. Her lifestyle photography, from children's portraits to celebrity portraits, has been published internationally. Lackey's work has been featured in media outlets, including Vogue, O – The Oprah Magazine, Town & Country, Parenting Magazine, Food & Wine, The Knot Men's Journal; in trade outlets; and on national television programs including NBC's The Martha Stewart Show and ABC's Extreme Makeover: Home Edition.

Lackey is a Nikon USA Ambassador, speaking on behalf of Nikon at conventions and programs, and she was the subject of a five-part web series on photographing children and family portraits, entitled Nikon Behind The Scenes. She also photographs commercial campaigns for the brand.

Lackey was the recipient of the 2015 WPPI/Rangefinder Humanitarian Award, awarded on behalf of her charitable contributions and as the co-founder of a non-profit in support of orphaned children. She was presented with the 2014 WPPI Adorama Inspire Award.

In 2008, Lackey released her first educational book for professionals, The Art of Children's Portrait Photography, which got favorable reviews. It went on to be re-published and translated into seven languages. Lackey teamed with Rex Ballard to produce Inside Contemporary Children's Photography, a 90-minute video released in January 2010.

In 2010 Lackey worked with Kubota Image Tools to develop a Kubota Artist Series Style Book & DVD Tutorial, The Tamara Lackey Style Book, to instruct viewers on improving their own portrait and children's photography using "Kubota Actions" (proprietary Photoshop plugins).

Lackey once again paired with Rex Ballard to develop a guide to help “everyday photographers” capture more from their life moments. Tamara Lackey's Capturing Life Through (Better) Photography teaches simple tips and tricks to improve basic point-and-shoot images. The book won the Booklist Editors' Choice Award in Media in 2011.

Lackey has also presented internationally at industry workshops and events, which include delivering presentations on the Google stage, serving as a keynote speaker at the National Association of Professional Child Photographers' Retreat and participating as a panel judge for the Wedding & Portrait Photographers International (WPPI) International Print Competition.

Lackey has co-produced and hosted multiple live broadcasts for CreativeLive.
