= Andy R. Thomson =

Canadian architect and environmentalist

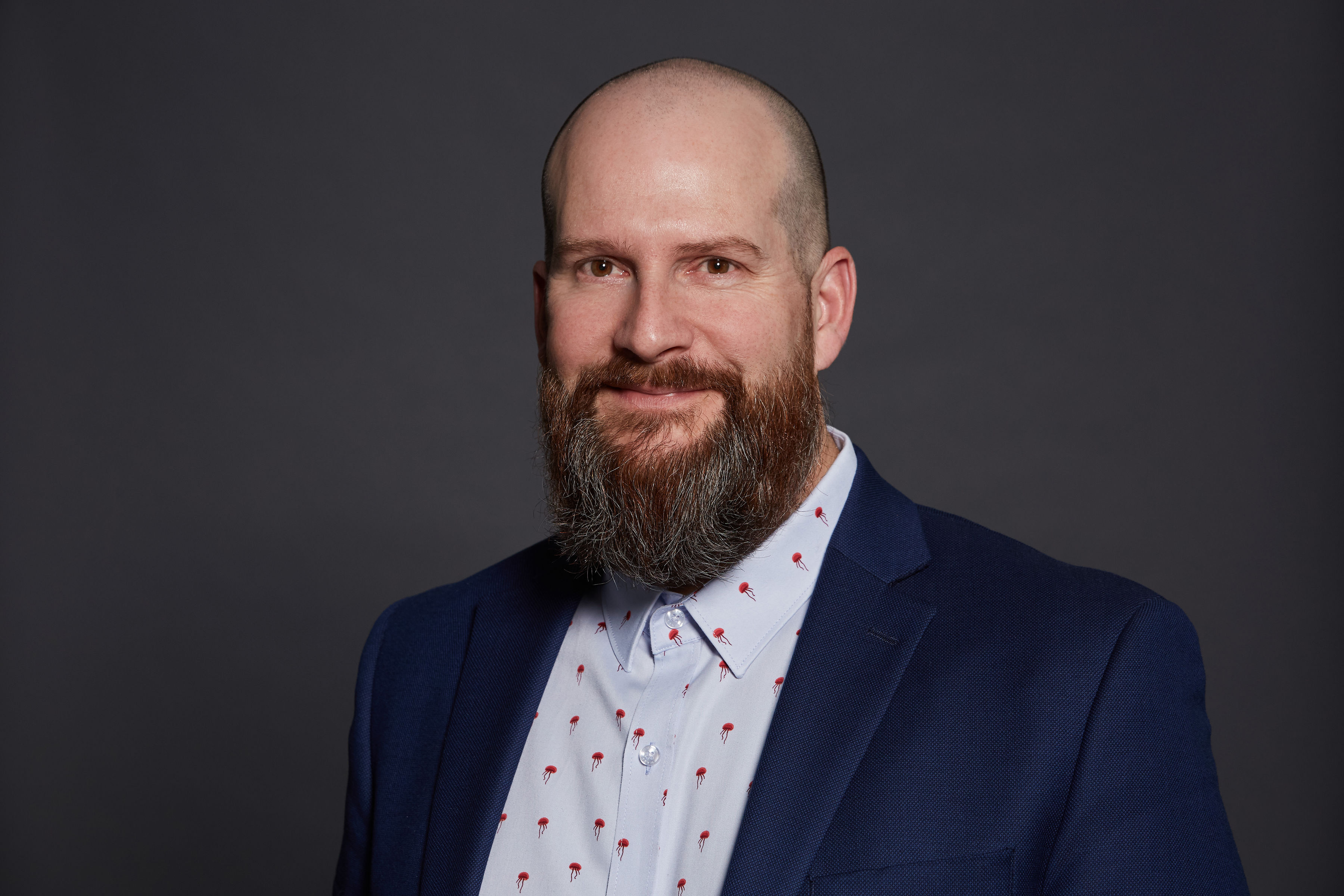
Andy Thomson, OAA Councillor and VP Strategic (2020)

Andy R. Thomson (born 1971) is a Canadian architect (M.Arch), environmentalist, tiny-home expert and an advocate for the small house movement. He is known for his design of miniHome which is a "completely self-sufficient, mobile dwelling, featuring solar and wind energy and recycled and/or nontoxic materials." MiniHome was developed from his master thesis An Experiment in Minimal Living in Downtown Toronto. He founded Sustain Design Studio, Ltd in 2005 to market the miniHomes. He has also worked for the R-2000 program. Andy subsequently founded the research-based Thomson Architecture Website design studio and Canadian Nonprofit OpenBuilding Website to promote 'OBJECTIVE TEUI3' - a standardized Building Energy Modelling and Building Code Review, reporting and validation framework.

Thomson completed his undergraduate degree in Architecture at the University of Stuttgart on a scholarship. He completed his master's in architecture at University of British Columbia and was licensed by the Ontario Association of Architects in 2017.

== See also ==
- Sustainable architecture
