= Andy Mouse =

1986 series of paintings by Keith Haring

- Artist: Keith Haring
- Year: 1986
- Movement: Pop art
- Dimensions: Four 38 x 38 inch silkscreens

Andy Mouse is a series of silkscreen prints created by American artist Keith Haring in 1985 and 1986. The character Andy Mouse is a fusion between Disney's Mickey Mouse and Andy Warhol. The series consists of four silkscreen prints on wove paper, released in an edition of 30 per colorway, all signed and dated in pencil by Haring and Warhol.

== History ==
Andy Warhol rose to prominence as the leading artist of the 1960s Pop art movement. He ventured into a variety of art forms and challenged the notion of the "sacred" definition of art by controversially blurring the lines between life and art. In the 1980s, Warhol became a mentor to a new generation of prolific younger artists who were dominating the downtown New York art scene.

Keith Haring moved to Manhattan to attend the School of Visual Arts in 1978. He gained recognition for his chalk graffiti drawings in the New York City Subway, which led to gallery exhibitions in the early 1980s. Haring's father, an engineer and amateur cartoonist, encouraged his early interest in cartoons, especially Disney, Dr. Suess, Charles Schulz, and the Looney Tunes, influences that are seen in Haring's work throughout his career.

Haring idolized Warhol and considered him the only "real" Pop artist. They met shortly before Haring's exhibition at the Tony Shafrazi Gallery in 1982. Warhol mentions in his diaries going to the closing party of the exhibition on November 13, 1982. In a 1989 Rolling Stone interview, Haring recalled when he met Warhol:

Before I knew him, he had been an image to me. He was totally unapproachable. I met him finally through Christopher Makos, who brought me to the Factory. At first Andy was very distant. It was difficult for him to be comfortable with people if he didn't know them. Then he came to another exhibition at the Fun Gallery, which was soon after the show at Shafrazi. He was more friendly. We started talking, going out. We traded a lot of works at that time."

Haring was often compared to Warhol in the way they transcended being a gallery artist and their mass appeal. Haring acknowledged their similarities but also clarified that he was a "different kind of artist." He stated, "Andy has been a big influence as an example of both what to be and what not to be. I have learned a lot of things from Andy about how to deal with people and how to deal with 'the public' and the public's 'image' of me."

Haring created the first Andy Mouse series in 1985. Mickey Mouse appeared frequently in Haring's artwork; he created a Mickey Mouse watch in 1986 for his Pop Shop.

In June 1986, Haring's Andy Mouse silkscreens were exhibited at the B-1 Gallery in Santa Monica, California. The show also included earlier works by both Haring and Warhol.

Soon after the completion of the series, Warhol died following gallbladder surgery on February 22, 1987. Haring, who was diagnosed with HIV/AIDS in 1988, died of AIDS-related complications on February 16, 1990.

== Analysis ==
The character Andy Mouse is a depiction of Andy Warhol as Mickey Mouse. Haring and Warhol both had a fascination with Disney, particularly Mickey Mouse.

In one of the portraits, Andy Mouse is pictured on a dollar bill. Haring stated: "It's like treating him [Warhol] like he was part of American culture, like Mickey Mouse was. That he himself had become a symbol, a sign for something complete, universally understandable. He sort of made this niche for himself in the culture. As much as Mickey Mouse had…putting him on a dollar bill was just making him even more like an icon or part of the American dream."

Richard Lloyd, International Head of Prints & Multiples, analyzed that "Andy Mouse is a brilliant culmination of Haring's entire oeuvre. Its bold graphic quality, complex composition and glorious color are high water marks for the artist. Andy Mouse's large scale and brilliant postmodern referencing of Pop icons such as Mickey Mouse—by way of Andy Warhol—mark this as a seminal Haring work which remains relevant to contemporary art today."

== Art market ==
A complete set of four Andy Mouse (1986) screenprints sold for $56,400 at Christie's in December 2001.

In May 2008, the painting Andy Mouse - New Coke (1985) sold for $1.8 million at Christie's.

Another set of four Andy Mouse (1986) screenprints sold for $629,000 at Christie's in April 2015.
