= Andy McQuade =

Andy McQuade is a British film and theatre director and writer, residing in LA. Co-founder of defunct Act Provocateur International, he is the recipient of 'Best Theatre Director, 2012' from Fringe Report. Now leading his own company, Second Skin Theatre initially based in Stoke Newington in the London Borough of Hackney, which "promotes new writing and readaptations of classics". McQuade's debut film directing role earned 'Truco' a Bronze Award from IIFA for Best Narrative Short. Second Skin Theatre has nurtured some incredible and emerging talent over the years, guided skilfully by McQuade's genius as theatre and film practitioner.

He was appointed to the judging panel of UK Webfest 2017, principally hosted at the Prince Charles Theatre, London, UK, with additional screenings in Manchester, Bath and Birmingham, UK. (McQuade has worked with many actors and producers on the London fringe and now works in Los Angeles). The annual awards recognise industry talent both in the UK and worldwide in the field of Best Web-based narrative dramas. Other notables on the panel include BAFTA winner Sophie Venner (Room 8) and BAFTA Nominee Benjamin Johns (Candy Bar Kid).

He is the author of the memoir Breaking The Chain detailing his escape from drug addiction and the revelation that he attempted to kill his abusive father at the age of twelve.

== Awards ==
London Solo Festival Awards 2007 - Best Actor/Best New Writing/Best Show

Awarded London Fringe Report's 'Best Theatre Director, 2012'

Bronze Prize 'Best Narrative Short, 2014' Truco
