= Overspray Magazine =

Overspray
- Categories: Street art
- Frequency: Quarterly
- Founder: iO Tillett Wright
- Founded: 2002
- Final issue: 2009
- Country: USA
- Language: English

Overspray Magazine was a street art magazine, named after the term "overspray". The magazine was founded by a group of artists headed by iO Tillett Wright in 2002 whose mission was to document and further art on the street as well as the people and culture surrounding it. Overspray was a quarterly magazine showcasing known and unknown artists, reviews on books and films, fictional writing, and event recaps. The magazine also hosted events and gallery shows, allowing artists to participate in open environments with few guidelines. It ceased publication in 2009. In 2006, Overspray participated in the closing exhibition of the Orchard Street Gallery.
