= Andy Grundy =

English rugby league footballer

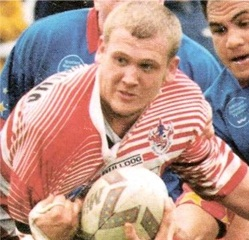

Personal information
- Full name: Andrew Thomas Grundy
- Born: 19 November 1977 (age 47) England

Playing information
- Position: Prop
Club
Years	Team	Pld	T	G	FG	P
1999–2000	Leigh Centurions	25	4	0	0	16
2001–02	Gateshead Thunder	24	7	0	0	28
2002–03	Lancashire Lynx	21	5	0	0	20
2003–04	Rochdale Hornets	19	3	0	0	12
	Total	89	19	0	0	76

Andy Grundy (born 19 November 1977) is an English former professional rugby league footballer who played in the 1990s and 2000s, he played as a prop.

== Rugby league playing career ==
Grundy, a one-time England Schoolboy International and Wigan Schoolboy Captain, started his professional career in the Wigan Warriors youth system. He was the first choice prop in the front-row for the all-conquering Alliance team, littered at the time with regular first team players. After impressing in a first team pre-season friendly for Wigan Warriors against Leigh Centurions, Grundy joined them on loan, before returning to Wigan Warriors the following season and signing a new contract, offered to him by the then coach John Monie. After the departure of coach Monie, Grundy went on to gain a first team squad number under new Wigan and Great Britain head coach Andy Goodway, before a change of coaching and management staff lead to a subsequent shake-up of playing staff, that lay witness to many fringe players' releases.

Grundy then went on to play for the Gateshead Thunder, Lancashire Lynx and the Rochdale Hornets in the Northern Ford Premiership. In 2001 Grundy was selected for Wales, after mutually agreeing to terminate his contract with Gateshead Thunder with three games of the season remaining, for a short stint with the Warrington Wolves.

== Injury and retirement ==
Reoccurring problems from a serious ankle injury, sustained during Grundy's time at Wigan Warriors, which required two ankle reconstruction surgeries, along with other factors, led to Grundy's decision to prematurely retire from the game.

== Alma mater ==
Grundy is a qualified lecturer and teacher, who graduated from the University of Central Lancashire with a First Class degree in Sport Coaching and winning the Gilbertson Excellence Award for Outstanding Academic Achievement. Grundy also graduated from the University of Central Lancashire with a master's degree in physical education and school sport and is a published academic researcher in the area of Sport Coaching, with a particular interest in the area of Philosophies.

== Coaching career ==
Grundy was named as Assistant Coach of England Colleges Rugby League Team in 2018, who played against a select French team and the winter international against the Australian Schoolboys, as part of their five-game tour of England.

== Radio and host speaker ==
Grundy is Rugby Football League (RFL) Media Accredited, often writing numerous articles, most notable being a regular page in the St Helens match day programme. Grundy is also a guest speaker and host, who often commentates on games, in particular the Championship and League One fixtures.
