= Thomas Lakey =

English footballer

Personal information
- Full name: Thomas Frederick Lakey
- Date of birth: 1874
- Place of birth: Stockton-on-Tees, England
- Date of death: 1932 (aged 57–58)
- Height: 5 ft 8 in (1.73 m)
- Position: Winger

Senior career*
Years	Team	Apps	(Gls)
1898–1899	Stockton		
1899–1901	Grimsby Town	30	(12)
- * Club domestic league appearances and goals

Thomas Frederick Lakey (1874–1932) was an English professional footballer who played as a winger.
