= IO Tillett Wright =

American author, speaker, and advocate (born 1985)

iO Wright
- Born: September 2, 1985 (age 41); New York City, U.S.
- Occupations: Author; Speaker; Advocate

iO Tillett Wright (born September 2, 1985) is an American author, photographer, public speaker and advocate. As of 2025, he is the co-founder and Chief Product Officer at PostFire, a nonprofit technology project that helps wildfire survivors rebuild their lives.

== Early life ==
Wright grew up in New York City with his mother, Rebecca Wright, a poet and actress. He documented the struggles of his upbringing in his memoir Darling Days.

== Career ==
=== Editor ===
In 2002, at the age of 17, Wright founded and served as editor-in-chief of a street art magazine, Overspray, until 2009.

=== Blogger and writer ===
From 2010 to 2012, Wright was a featured columnist for T Magazine, at The New York Times where he had two blogs called Notes From The Underground—for which iO reviewed underground performances—and The Lowdown.

Wright's first book, Darling Days, A Memoir was released on September 27, 2016, by Ecco Books, an imprint of HarperCollins.

Wright's second book, Self Evident Truths: 10,000 Portraits of Queer America, was published on September 15, 2020, by Prestel.

Wright's third book, Oasis: Modern Desert Homes Around The World, was published in November, 2020, by Clarkson Potter.

=== Speaker ===
In 2012, Wright delivered a talk at TEDxWomen in Washington, DC, called Fifty Shades Of Gay, discussing sexuality and gender as a spectrum. The talk has been viewed over 3 million times.

=== Photographer ===
Wright is a self-taught photographer who, on September 22, 2010, opened Breedings, his first solo show of photographs, at Fuse Gallery in Manhattan.

In August 2011, Wright debuted Camila, his second solo show, and Act Like You're Fine, a group show he curated at Tokyo's Vacant Gallery.

From 2010 to 2020, Wright worked on a project called Self Evident Truths. To date, Wright has photographed 10,000 people in all 50 of the United States, creating the largest photographic document of a marginalized group in history. On September 15, 2020, a monograph, called "Self Evident Truths" that includes all ten thousand images, has been published by Prestel.

=== Actor ===
As an actor, Wright appeared in several independent films, including in a 2004 appearance as a McDonald's worker in Sex and the City, and after an over decade long hiatus, with a part in the feature film Holy New York (2020).

=== Television host ===
In 2016, Wright co-hosted the MTV show Suspect with Nev Schulman.

In 2017, Wright was a co-host with Max Joseph, on Episode 6 of Season 6 of MTV's, Catfish: The TV Show.

=== Podcaster ===
In 2019, Wright produced and hosted The Ballad Of Billy Balls, a true crime investigation of the murder of the love of his mother's life.

In 2021, Wright produced and hosted Cover Story: Power Trip, an investigation of abuses within the world of psychedelic therapy, for New York Magazine.
