= Andrew Bell (journalist) =

Canadian journalist

Andrew Bell (fl. 1827–63) was a Scottish-born Canadian journalist. He was well educated. His work and life is well known in the period indicated.

Bell was a successful lecturer and journalist in Scotland when he became involved with a collection of letters belonging to General James Wolfe. This, no doubt, attracted him to Canada and he arrived there in about 1857. In 1858 he was the editor of the Montreal Pilot. He considered Canada his adopted home in that period.

He is important to history for his writings which included two major works pertaining to Canada: General James Wolfe, his life and death and a creative translation of Garneau's Histoire du Canada.
