= Lakki, Chabahar =

Lakki لكي
- Village
- Location within Iran
- Coordinates: 25°21′37″N 60°45′05″E
- Country: Iran
- Province: Sistan and Baluchestan
- County: Chabahar
- Bakhsh: Central
- Rural District: Kambel-e Soleyman

Population (2006)
  - Total: 53
- Time zone: UTC+3:30 (IRST)
  - Summer (DST): UTC+4:30 (IRDT)

Lakki (Persian: لكي, also Romanized as Lakkī) is a village in Kambel-e Soleyman Rural District, in the Central District of Chabahar County, Sistan and Baluchestan Province, Iran. At the 2006 census, its population was 53, in 11 families.
