= John Alexander Lackey House =

Historic house in North Carolina, United States

- U.S. National Register of Historic Places
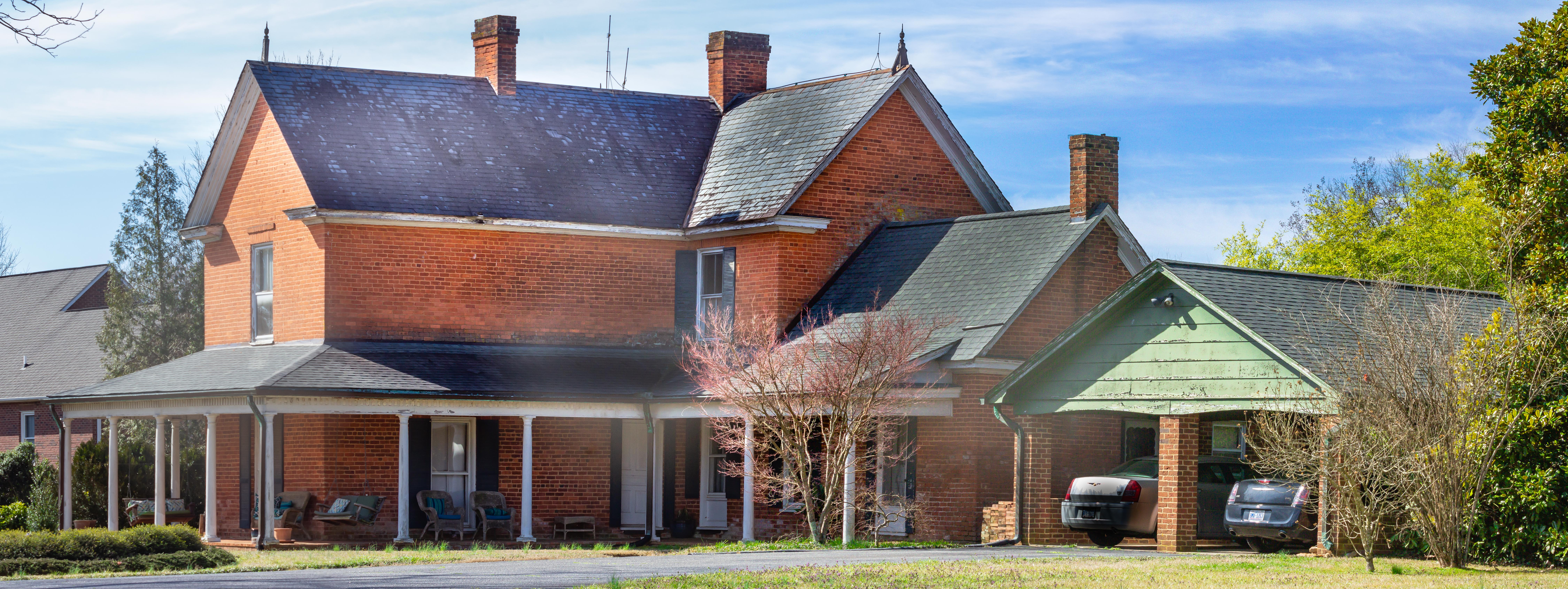

- Location within North Carolina Location within the United States
- Location: 102 Camelot Dr., Morganton, North Carolina
- Coordinates: 35°46′5″N 81°43′7″W
- Area: 2.3 acres (0.93 ha)
- Built: c. 1900
- Architectural style: Colonial Revival
- MPS: Morganton MRA
- NRHP reference No.: 87001921
- Added to NRHP: November 9, 1987

John Alexander Lackey House is a historic home located at Morganton, Burke County, North Carolina. It was built about 1900, and is a two-story, T-shaped, gable roofed, brick farmhouse. It has a one-story, gabled kitchen wing. The house features Colonial Revival style detailing.

It was listed on the National Register of Historic Places in 1987.
