= Andrew Bell (cricketer) =

English cricketer

Personal information
- Full name: Andrew John Bell
- Born: 22 January 1982 (age 44); High Wycombe, Buckinghamshire, England
- Batting: Right-handed

Domestic team information
- Years: Team
- 2001: Dorset

Career statistics
Competition	List A
Matches	1
Runs scored	22
Batting average	–
100s/50s	–/–
Top score	22*
Catches/stumpings	–/–
- Source: Cricinfo, 4 July 2022

Andrew John Bell (born 22 January 1982) is an English former cricketer. He was a right-handed batsman who played for Dorset. He was born in High Wycombe, Buckinghamshire.

Bell made a single List A appearance for the side, against Scotland in September 2001. He scored 22 not out, but was unable to save Dorset from a ten-wicket defeat.
