= Andy Vesey =

American business leader (born 1955)

- Born: Andrew Martin Vesey; United States
- Education: Union College, New York University
- Spouse: Miranda Vesey

Andy Vesey (born 1955) is an American energy industry executive. He is the founder and CEO of EdgePrimePower, an energy-as-a-service company.

== Early life ==
Vesey was born in 1955 and grew up on Manhattan’s Upper East Side. His parents settled in New York having fled their native Hungary as the Nazis rose to prominence in the 1930s; his father gaining US citizenship by serving as a paratrooper with the 82nd Airborne during World War II. He graduated from Union College in Schenectady, New York, where he received a BA in Economics and a BSc in Mechanical Engineering. He went on to study for a Masters of Science degree at New York University.

== Professional career ==
Identifying energy as “the issue of the day”, Vesey started out as an engineer at New York utility Consolidated Edison, before joining Niagara Mohawk Power Corporation.

Vesey subsequently worked in leadership roles at Ernst and Young and FTI Consulting, before joining AES Corporation in 2004. He held a number positions at AES, including running the business in Latin America, before becoming Executive Vice President and Chief Operating Officer in 2012. There he led the company’s Global Operations portfolio across 20 countries.

Having run the Melbourne-based Citipower Pty Ltd in the late 1990s, Vesey returned to Australia as Managing Director and CEO of AGL Energy Limited in February 2015. Citi analyst Dale Koenders described the appointment as “a good time to change the perception of AGL” and Vesey's first action as CEO was to place AGL Energy’s entire upstream gas business under review.

Vesey implemented a new Greenhouse Gas Policy in 2015, including a commitment for AGL to close its existing coal-fired power stations by 2050. In an interview with Guardian Australia, Vesey spoke of his desire to take AGL "out of the CO2 emissions business".

In March 2017, Vesey launched the world’s largest residential virtual power plant in South Australia at the time. The plant involved connecting batteries being installed in homes and businesses in South Australia, initially targeting 5 MW of peak capacity.

The initiative's launch resulted in a public row between Federal Energy Minister Josh Frydenberg and South Australian Premier Jay Weatherill during a media conference, at which Vesey was also answering questions. Vesey commented that Frydenberg and Weatherill needed to "keep talking".

Also in March 2017, Vesey responded to Elon Musk’s claim that Tesla could solve Australia’s energy shortage crisis within 100 days - offering him a site for a grid battery farm in South Australia. In August 2018, Vesey resigned from his position at AGL.

In 2019, Vesey co-founded Earthrise Energy, an independent power producer. In August 2019, Pacific Gas & Electric Company appointed Vesey its President and CEO during its Chapter 11 reorganization and wildfire-recovery efforts. Vesey later stepped down in July 2020 as PG&E emerged out of bankruptcy.

== Awards ==
In October 2016, the Climate Alliance recognised Vesey as its Business Leader of the Year, citing his role in launching “numerous initiatives to transition towards a carbon constrained future”. In the same year, he was named at number 11 in the Australian Financial Review’s 2016 Corporate Power List.

In December 2017, Vesey was named CEO of the Year at the S&P Global Platts Global Energy Awards. He was recognised by the judges as "progressive, enlightened and hard-charging", and praised for moving AGL away from coal to a diverse portfolio of renewables. In the same month Vesey was named by The Australian Financial Review as one of its Business People of the Year, having “managed to move the country’s biggest greenhouse gas emitter forward along what he sees as an inevitable path of carbon reduction”.
