= Andy Everson =

First Nations artist from British Columbia (born 1972)

Andy Everson (born September 20, 1972) is a contemporary Indigenous artist born in Comox, British Columbia. He was named Nagedzi after his grandfather Chief Andy Frank. Everson's artworks are greatly influenced by his Kʼómoks and Kwakwaka'wakw ancestries. His artwork is said to be "magnificent, beautiful and bountiful and presents strong imagery, tells a tale, sings a song, passes on a legend, dispels myth and in general fills the spirit and the body with a renewed respect".

== Education ==
Inspired by his grandmother wanting to pursue his traditional culture, Everson completed undergraduate and a master's degree in anthropology at the University of British Columbia. Because of the location of Comox First Nation that lies on the border between the larger Coast Salish and Kwakwaka'wakw realms, his thesis was heavily influenced by contemporary Comox identity. His extended knowledge in anthropology gave him knowledge about linguistics which helped him create the company—Copper Canoe, Inc that created Aboriginal media.

== Early life ==
Everson began drawing Northwest Coast art when he was a young child. In the 1900s he actually started up his own career as an artist when he started designing and painting "chillkat blankets" for use in ceremonies such as potlatches. He tried to follow the traditions of his ancestors while also adding his own contemporary style to his art.

== Other forms of art ==
Aside from his art, Everson performed dances and sang songs. These ceremonial songs and dances were performed at potlatches and Everson joined dance groups such as the Gwa'wina Dancers and the Le-La-La Dancers and he formed his own group, the Kumugwe Dancers. In 2011, Everson joined a group of Canadian First Nation performers that traveled to Taiwan to perform in one of the nation's 100th Anniversary celebrations as part of the Global Indigenous Peoples Performing Arts Initiative. Everson has participated in culture events in Canada, the Netherlands, Mexico and Taiwan.

== Group exhibitions ==
=== 2018- Recent Acquisitions from the Southwest ===
Everson was one of the artists that displayed his work at the CN Gorman Museum from October 3, 2018 to December 8, 2018, located at the University of California, Davis. The exhibition displayed artwork from the Pacific Northwest Coast.

=== 2019- Indigenous Futurisms ===
Everson was an artist that displayed his work at the Indigenous Futurisms exhibition. This exhibition was a mix of traditional art with a futuristic twist to it.

=== 2019- Abadakone ===
Àbadakone was a group exhibition at National Gallery of Canada, Special Exhibitions Galleries and Public Spaces from November 8, 2019 to April 5, 2020. The exhibition presented contemporary indigenous art. The exhibition also exhibited performance art and videos.

== Select artworks ==
Everson creates most of his pieces on the computer and uses a stylus to draw on his tablet. Using a computer makes files easy to send and change. It is convenient to create art digitally, but some people claim that art created on a computer is not real art. Everson, who is a modernized artist, sees the computer as a tool. His studio is composed of his two giclee printers. Giclee printers are similar to jet printers, but they are bigger and use pigment based-inks to make them last much longer. Aside from computer art, Everson does screen printing work. Screen printing allows him to make art with very bold lines with positive and negative spaces. Everson also experiences with carving, painting and photo realism.

Two of his known artworks are "Idle No More and "No Pipelines. "Idle No More" is a logo of a fist holding a feather. "No Pipelines" is a graphic by Everson that is also used on signs and buttons in Canada and the United States. Everson's artwork is also featured in many teen and kid books such as "Groundswell: Indigenous Knowledge and a Call to Action for Climate Change", "I Am Raven: A story of Discovery", "Je Suis Corbeau" and "Sous La Lune De Corbeau". He has also utilized the Star Wars franchise in his artwork, in order to show how he feels about current issues.

Everson's art was engraved on a three coin set released by the Royal Canadian Mint. The coins had designs of raindrops, sun rays, maple leaves and a sunflower to symbolize the four seasons. The designs of the coins were: Interconnection, beaver, thunderbird, the whale, which represent land, air, and sea. The coins were made of either a solid silver with a hologram finish or pure gold. 1,500 of the gold coins were minted and 7,500 silver coins are available.

== Awards ==
=== Jubilee Award ===
Everson earned the Queen Elizabeth II Royal Diamond Jubilee award for recognizing aboriginal veterans. The artwork that earned him this award was "Remembrance". It was a giclee print is a stylized poppy design made up of four thunderbirds.
