= Kaysie Lackey =

Food artist and cake decorating instructor

- Born: 2 March 1981 (age 45); Brentwood, Tennessee
- Education: Bachelor's in Fine Art and Art History from Belmont University
- Culinary career
- Cooking style: Cake Sculpting
- Current restaurant(s): The People's Cake, Seattle, WA Innovative Sugarworks, Seattle, WA www.sugarworks.com
- Television show(s): Food Network Challenge, Sugar Showdown, and Cake Wars

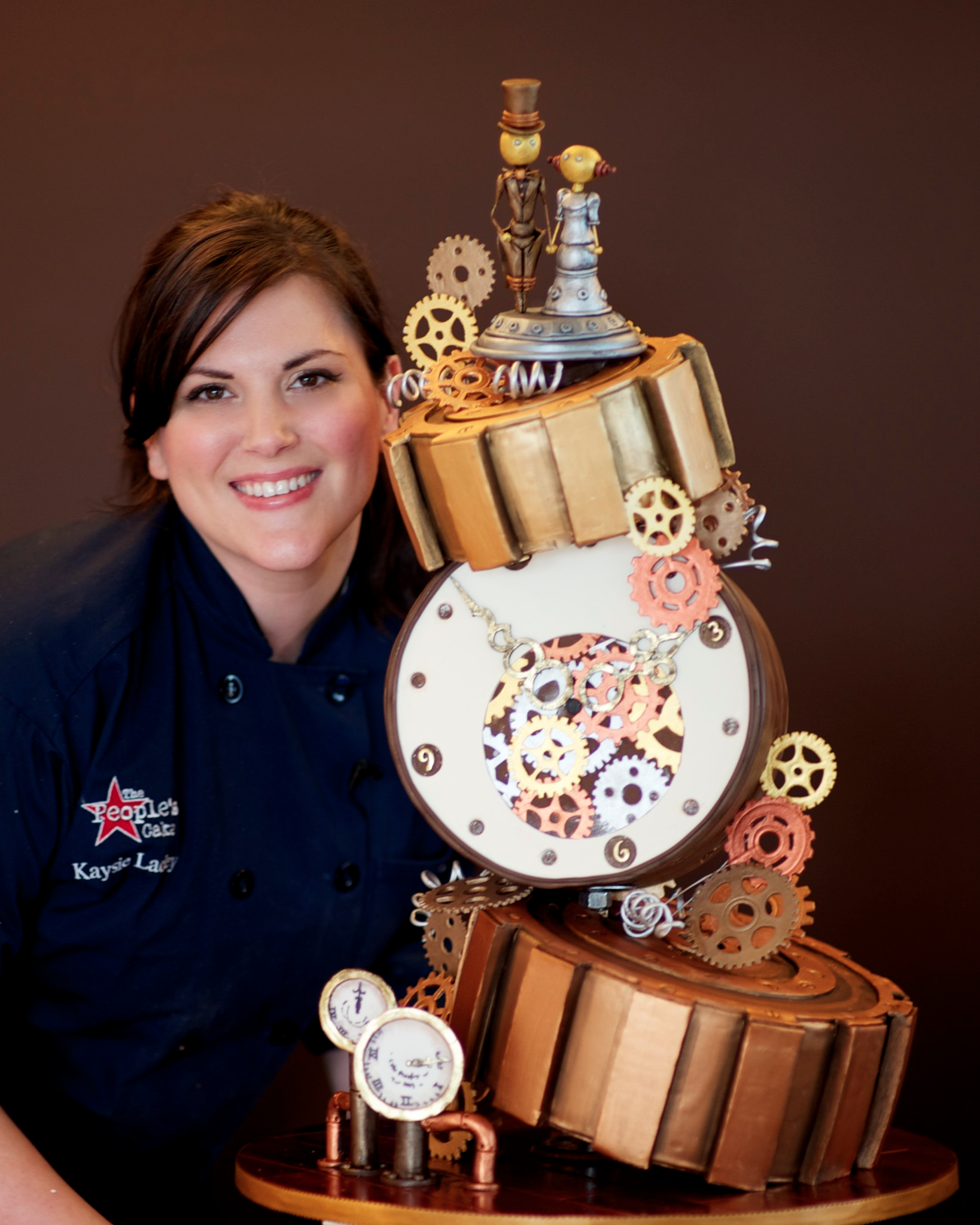
Kaysie Lackey and gravity defying steampunk cake.

Kaysie Rogers-Lackey (born Brentwood, Tennessee, USA) is a food artist and cake decorating instructor based in Seattle, Washington. As owner of The People's Cake in Seattle, WA, she has been featured in wedding and cake magazines, including "Brides", Martha Stewart Weddings", Modern Wedding Cakes, Seattle Bride, "Seattle Metropolitan Bride and Groom" and American Cake Decorating. In 2015 Kaysie was also profiled in The Wall Street Journal's "What's In Her Bag?". She is a frequent competitor on Food Network Challenge cake decorating competitions, having been featured on four different episodes, and winning three as of 2012. She was also featured on Food Network's "Last Cake Standing". Kaysie teaches at cake decorating schools in the United Kingdom, United States, Mexico, Canada, Australia, Asia, Africa, South America, India, throughout Europe, and the Middle East. The People's Cake was named one of "Brides" magazine's Top 100 Cake Decorators in the United States in 2013. Kaysie was named one of "Martha Stewart Wedding's" Top 63 Pastry Professionals in 2014 and "Dessert Professionals" magazine's.

In 2014 Kaysie became a spokesperson for the cake decorating tool company Innovative Sugarworks .
