= Andy Gayle =

English footballer and coach (born 1970)

Personal information
- Full name: Andrew Gayle
- Date of birth: 19 September 1970 (age 56)
- Place of birth: Manchester, England
- Position: Striker

Senior career*
Years	Team	Apps	(Gls)
1988–1989	Oldham Athletic	1	(0)
1989–????	Crewe Alexandra	1	(0)
	Bury	0	(0)
- Horwich RMI
- Naxxar Lions
- Horwich RMI
- Stalybridge Celtic
- Accrington Stanley
- Horwich RMI
- Ashton United
- Flixton
- Witton Albion
- Chorley
- Oldham Town
????–2000	Nantwich Town		
2000	Rossendale United		
2000	St Helens Town		
2000–2002	Mossley		
2003	Winsford United		
2003–????	Abbey Hey		
- Rossendale United
- * Club domestic league appearances and goals

Andrew Gayle (born 19 September 1970) is an English former professional footballer. He played in The Football League for Oldham Athletic and Crewe Alexandra. He is assistant coach of Rossendale United.

Gayle was a trainee with Oldham Athletic and played once in the league for them during the 1988–89 season. He joined Crewe Alexandra, but again played just once. He had spell with Bury without playing in the league before dropping out of The Football League on joining Horwich RMI. He had a spell in Malta with Naxxar Lions before returning to Horwich. He subsequently played for Stalybridge Celtic, Accrington Stanley, Horwich (for a third time), Ashton United, Flixton, Witton Albion, Chorley and Oldham Town before joining Nantwich Town. He scored over 30 times in the 1999–2000 season and signed for Rossendale United in the 2000 close-season. However, he quit Rossendale in October 2000 to join St Helens Town as a protest at the sacking of Rossendale manager Micky Graham.

He stayed just a month with St Helens, joining Mossley in November 2000.

In March 2003 he signed for Winsford United and in July 2003 joined Abbey Hey.

He later became a coach with Rossendale United where he was reported to be also working as a taxicab driver.
