= Andy Mulliner =

English-Welsh footballer (born 1971)

Personal information
- Full name: Andrew William Mulliner
- Date of birth: 3 January 1971 (age 55)
- Place of birth: Shrewsbury, England
- Position: Goalkeeper

Youth career
- 1987–1989: Port Vale

Senior career*
Years	Team	Apps	(Gls)
1989–1990	Telford United	1	(0)
1990	Bangor City	14	(0)
1990–1991	Accrington Stanley	12	(0)
1991–1992	Curzon Ashton	14	(0)
1992–1999	Llansantffraid	213	(0)
1994	→ Aberystwyth Town (loan)	1	(0)
1999	Rhyl	2	(0)
1999–2000	Bangor City	27	(0)
2000	Connah's Quay Nomads	3	(0)
2000	Bangor City	1	(0)
2001	Aberystwyth Town	1	(0)
2001	Newtown	4	(0)
2001	Connah's Quay Nomads	22	(0)
2001–2008	Caersws	190	(0)
2008–2009	Welshpool Town	7	(0)
2009–2010	Ellesmere Rangers	42	(0)
2010	Bangor City	0	(0)
2010–2011	Ellesmere Rangers	23	(0)
2011–2012	Airbus UK	11	(0)
Total		588	(0)

International career
1988	Wales U18	1	(0)
1996	Wales Semi-Pro	1	(0)
- * Club domestic league appearances and goals

Andrew Mulliner (born 3 January 1971) is an English-born Welsh former football goalkeeper who is the academy lead goalkeeper coach at Manchester City.

He spent most of his career in Welsh football, where his 1-game tally in the Welsh Football League is a record for a goalkeeper. He also held the record for the most appearances for TNS, with 266 appearances between 1993 and 1999. This followed brief spells in English football with Telford United, Accrington Stanley, and Curzon Ashton. His career after leaving TNS saw him keep goal for Aberystwyth Town, Rhyl, Bangor City, Connah's Quay Nomads, Newtown, Caersws, Welshpool Town, Ellesmere Rangers, and Airbus UK. He has worked as a goalkeeping coach for Shrewsbury Town, Port Vale, Wolverhampton Wanderers Academy, Kidderminster Harriers, Bury, Stockport County and The New Saints. His coaching qualifications include holding the UEFA A Licence outfield, the new UEFA GK A Licence, the FA A Licence Goalkeeping coaching qualification, the FA Advanced Youth Award and the FA Youth Award modules, having previously completed his 'B' licence in both outfield play and goalkeeping.

== Playing career ==
Mulliner started his career as a reserve team player at Port Vale, though he never made a first-team appearance for the club or indeed in the Football League. Despite this, in 1988 he won a cap for the Wales under-18 side in a match against Northern Ireland.

After leaving Port Vale, he joined Telford United, appearing once on Boxing Day 1989 in a 3–1 victory at Aggborough. At the start of the 1990–91 season, he joined Bangor City, playing in the Northern Premier League before dropping down a division to join Accrington Stanley. The following season, he joined Curzon Ashton before joining Llansantffraid in January 1992, who were playing in the Cymru Alliance.

He first appeared in the Welsh Premier League with Llansantffraid in the 1993–94 season – the second season of the league's establishment. He played 31 league games for the club that season, as well as one on loan at Aberystwyth Town. Staying with Llansantffraid for the following five seasons, he played a further 182 league games for the club. He was present when they changed their name to Total Network Solutions.

Between 8 August 1995 and 18 October 1997, Mulliner played 117 consecutive competitive matches for the club, including the 1996 Welsh Cup final, which was the last competitive game to be played at the Cardiff Arms Park. In that final, he was blamed for two of Barry Town's three goals but became the hero by saving two of Town's penalties in the shoot-out. During his time, the club were a solid mid-table performer. He was not there for their league-winning season of 1999–2000, having moved on to Rhyl. He represented the League of Wales in a game against the League of Ireland and was also capped at semi-professional level in a game against England in 1996. He also played European football for LLansantffraid in the UEFA Cup Winner Cup v Ruch Chorwoz in 1996, for Ebbw Vale FC in the first leg of their Inter-toto Cup games v Konsvinger in 1997 and Bangor City in 2001 v Halmstad in the UEFA Cup.

He spent the 2000–01 season with Bangor City, making 27 league appearances. He then had brief spells with Connah's Quay Nomads, Bangor City (again), Aberystwyth Town and Newtown before playing 22 games of Connah's Quay 2001–02 season. In 2002, he settled with Caersws and spent the next seven seasons at the Recreation Ground, making close to 200 league appearances. During the 2003–04 and 2004–05 seasons his team reached fifth place, a personal best for Mulliner. He joined Welshpool Town in August 2008 and made seven league and four cup appearances in the 2008–09 season. He moved on to Ellesmere Rangers in July 2009, ending a run of 16 years of playing in the Welsh league. This ended his 481-game tally in the Welsh Football League, a record for a goalkeeper. He achieved promotion with Ellesmere Rangers out of the West Midlands (Regional) League, and also helped them to victory in the Shropshire Challenge Cup, with a 3–1 win over Market Drayton at the New Meadow in Shrewsbury. In July 2010, Mulliner re-signed for former club Bangor City for a short while for their run in the UEFA Europa League, playing in Finland and Portugal. He then returned to Ellesmere Rangers for the start of the league season. He signed for Welsh Premier League side Airbus UK on August transfer deadline day for the 2011–12 season, making 11 league and two cup appearances before announcing his retirement following their 1–0 defeat to Aberystwyth Town in the Europa League play-offs. His tally of 492 league appearances is the record for a Goalkeeper in the Welsh Premier League.

== Coaching career ==
Mulliner served as an assistant manager and player-goalkeeping coach at Ellesmere Rangers from 2009 to 2011. He has also worked as a goalkeeper coach at the Wolverhampton Wanderers academy (2006 to 2012) at Kidderminster Harriers (2006 to 2012), Shrewsbury Town (2006 to 2008) Shrewsbury School (2008 to 2012), Shrewsbury Sixth Form College (2007 to 2014), The New Saints (2010 to 2012), Bury (2011) helping the club achieve promotion to League 1, Port Vale (2011) and Stockport County (2011 to 2012). He was appointed as the Head of Academy goalkeeping at Birmingham City in June 2012 and worked with the Wales under-19 squad for the match against Germany in September 2012. In July 2014, he was appointed lead goalkeeping coach at Norwich City, leaving Norwich in July 2015 to take up the same role at Manchester City. In December 2015, he was promoted to EDS goalkeeper coach, leading the academy department & helping Manchester City EDS to win their first ever PL2 Championship in the 2020-21 season, under head coach Enzo Maresca. On 1 July 2021 he changed role, stepping down as the Academy Lead Goalkeeping coach, to become Head of UK Goalkeeper Scouting. In terms of international football, in September 2015, he returned to the Welsh international set-up, working with Wales under-21 on a part-time basis for their European Championships qualifying campaign, continuing until the end of that campaign in April 2016.

== Honours ==
Llansantffraid

- Konica League of Wales Cup: 1995
- Welsh Cup: 1996

Bangor City

- Welsh Cup: 2000

Caersws FC

- Welsh Premier League Cup: 2006

Ellesmere Rangers

- Shropshire Challenge Cup: 2010

Ellesmere Rangers

- West Midlands (Regional) League promotion: 2010
