= Andoniaina =

Andoniaina is a Malagasy given name. Notable people with that name include the following:

- Andoniaina Andriamalala (born 1985), Malagasy footballer
- Andoniaina Rakotondrazaka Andrianavalona, birthname of Ando Rakotondrazaka (born 1987), Malagasy footballer
