= Laki, Vinica =

Laki Лаки
- Village
- Location within North Macedonia
- Coordinates: 41.797707°N 22.667693°E
- Country: North Macedonia
- Region: Eastern
- Municipality: Vinica

Population (2002)
  - Total: 314
- Time zone: UTC+1 (CET)
  - Summer (DST): UTC+2 (CEST)
- Website: .

Laki (Macedonian: Лаки) is a village in the municipality of Vinica, North Macedonia. Laki is situated along the regional Vinica-Berovo road, nestled among scenic hills in the Obozna (Macedonian: Обозна) region. The village is traversed by two rivers, one of which flows through the entire length of the village.

== Demographics ==
According to the 2002 census, the village had a total of 314 inhabitants. Ethnic groups in the village include:

- Macedonians 314
