= Andy Hollingworth =

British photographer

Andy Hollingworth is a British photographer, renowned for his portraits of figures from the world of comedy.

== Background ==
He took up photography in 1986 while still at college in London and began documenting comedians in 1995. One of his most vivid childhood memories is seeing his grandfather sitting watching television and laughing at Charlie Williams on The Golden Shot. Williams became his first subject.

To date, Hollingworth has photographed many hundreds of comedians and comic actors from all schools of comedy, and his vast portfolio includes Bill Bailey, Steve Martin, Jo Brand, Ken Dodd, Victoria Wood, Ricky Gervais, Eddie Izzard, Beryl Reid, Rowan Atkinson, Eric Idle, Michael Palin, Stephen Fry, Flight of the Conchords, The Mighty Boosh, Ross Noble, Paul Merton and the Comedy Store Players. He was the sole photographer granted access on the set of Ricky Gervais and Stephen Merchant's seminal show The Office, staged a solo exhibition at the National Media Museum and Hollingworth's work is now recognized as an important archive for the medium. His particular style of photography and his deep understanding of comedy and his subjects has made him build long relationships with many comedians such as Bill Bailey (photographed more than 40 times), Phill Jupitus, Rhod Gilbert, Dylan Moran, and has been referred to by Sarah Millican as "her favourite photographer" in her book How to be Champion.

Outside the comedy industry, he has photographed a range of cultural figures; Ian McKellen, Billy Bragg, Simon Armitage, Ken Loach Jim Broadbent, Jarvis Cocker, Carol Ann Duffy, Willy Russell, Graham Dean, Richard Dawkins, Roger McGough, Anthony Gormley and Brian Cox.

His work has toured in several major exhibitions and he has been published in The Independent, The Big Issue, the Daily Express, The Times, the Journal of the Royal Photographic Society and has twice been featured in the British Comedy Awards. In January 2011 his work was featured in a two-day conference on the art of comedy, held at the British Library. He rarely gives interviews and has described his work as "just a Sunday hobby".

He had two solo exhibitions, Reverse Angle: Andy Hollingworth Portraits 2005–2014 in 2014 at The Grosvenor Museum in Chester, Cheshire.

Running from Greenbaum in 2015 ran in London at the former "Snap" Gallery in Picadilly Arcade, from 13 August to 19 September and proved so popular that it got extended by a week.

Hollingworth's photographs are also included in the collections of the National Portrait Gallery.

Recently, his work has "taken a left turn" and Hollingworth is now building a huge archive of objects belonging to comedians. This work of documentation has been making progress and reports objects as early as 1840s belonging to Grimaldi to our times. He has now become an authority on "Little Tich", a British comedian well known for his "Big Boots dance" routine in the early century.
