= Andy Sokol =

Profile
- Positions: Halfback, Punter

Personal information
- Born: c. 1928
- Died: August 1991 (aged 62–63); Winnipeg, Manitoba
- Listed height: 5 ft 11 in (1.80 m)
- Listed weight: 195 lb (88 kg)

Career history
- 1946–1947: Hamilton Tigers
- 1950–1954: Winnipeg Blue Bombers

Andrew Cyril Sokol (c. 1928 – August 1991) was a Canadian professional football player who played for the Hamilton Tigers and Winnipeg Blue Bombers. He previously played football at the University of Western Ontario.
