= Andy Stewart (Scottish footballer) =

Scottish footballer

Personal information
- Full name: Andrew Stewart
- Date of birth: 2 January 1978 (age 48)
- Place of birth: Dumfries, Scotland
- Position: Goalkeeper

Youth career
- Dundee United

Senior career*
Years	Team	Apps	(Gls)
1995–1999	Dundee United	0	(0)
1997	→ Partick Thistle (loan)	9	(0)
1998	→ East Fife (loan)	19	(0)
1999–2001	East Fife	22	(0)
- * Club domestic league appearances and goals

Andrew Stewart (born 2 January 1978) is a Scottish former professional footballer who played as a goalkeeper for Partick Thistle and East Fife.

== Career ==
Stewart began his professional career in 1995 with Dundee United, but he did not make a first-team appearance for the club. During his time with Dundee United, he gained playing experience through two loan spells

In 1997, he joined Partick Thistle on loan, making 9 league appearances in the SFL First Division. His debut was on 30 August 1997 in a $1-1$ draw against Airdrieonians. He managed one clean sheet during his time with the club on 1 November 1997

In 1998, he was loaned to East Fife, where he made 19 league appearances.

He later signed permanently for East Fife in February 1999 and played a further 22 league games for the club before concluding his professional career in 2001. His total professional club appearances amount to 50 across all domestic competitions for Partick Thistle and East Fife.

Stewart is also listed to have played for junior clubs Lochee United and Dundee North End at other points in his playing career.
