= Andy Hyman =

American dramatist

Andy Hyman (born November 27, 1981) is a playwright from Los Angeles, California. His plays include The Crusaders, Sanguine, Lies 7, Grand Junction, La Dispute and Drake the Amazing.

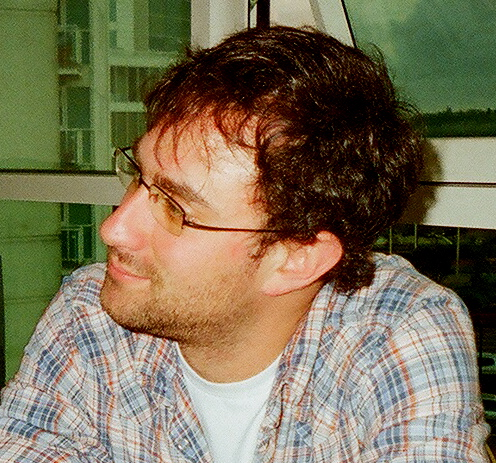
Andy Hyman in London, 2008

== Biography ==
Andy Hyman grew up in the North Hollywood area of Los Angeles. He attended Oakwood School in North Hollywood and Kenyon College in Ohio, graduating in 2003. In 2008 he received an M.A. from the Royal Central School of Speech and Drama.

== Works ==
Andy Hyman produced and directed his first play, The Crusaders, in the fall of 1998, while attending Oakwood School.

Hyman's one-man play, Sanguine, was given its first workshop production in Los Angeles in 2001. The play was produced again in 2003 starring Jeremy Sisto and directed by Jon Shear (both of whom had also been part of the original 2001 Young Playwright's Festival production) at the Second Stage Theatre in Los Angeles. According to the LA Times in an article about the production, Hyman had written the original script for Sanguine at the age of 19.

Sanguine was also staged in New York City by the Double Helix Theatre Company, in a production directed by David Muse.

In March and April 2005, a double bill of two Hyman's one-act plays, Lies 7 and Grand Junction, appeared at The Complex in Los Angeles. Hyman directed Lies 7 himself, while Grand Junction was directed by Rory C. Mitchell.

In July and August 2009, Hyman's new adaptation of the 18th century play La Dispute by Pierre Marivaux was staged at both the Old Red Lion Theatre and Soho Theatre in London, and at the Edinburgh Festival Fringe. A second production of La Dispute, along with Hyman's play, Drake the Amazing, took place at the Darlinghurst Theatre, Sydney, Australia, in July and August 2011.

In 2018 Hyman enrolled in South Western Law School and now works as an attorney.
