= Andy Carrington =

English footballer

Personal information
- Full name: Andrew Carrington
- Date of birth: 14 November 1936
- Place of birth: Grimsby, England
- Height: 5 ft 10 in (1.78 m)
- Position: Defender

Senior career*
Years	Team	Apps	(Gls)
1955–1962	Grimsby Town	4	(0)
- * Club domestic league appearances and goals

Andrew Carrington (born 14 November 1936) was an English professional footballer who played as a defender.
