= Andy Karsner =

American technology entrepreneur

- Born: Alexander Karsner; April 5, 1967 (age 57); Victorville, California, U.S.
- Education: Rice University (BA); University of Hong Kong (MA)

Alexander Karsner (born April 5, 1967) is an American technology entrepreneur, venture capitalist, and energy and environmental policymaker.

Karsner was most recently Managing Partner at Emerson Collective, where he founded and led Elemental, its environmental practice. He is a Senior Strategist and Space Cowboy at X and a Precourt Energy Scholar at Stanford University. From 2006 to 2008, Karsner served in the United States Department of Energy as Assistant Secretary for Energy Efficiency and Renewable Energy.

In 2021 it made headlines when he was elected to the ExxonMobil Board of Directors as one of the first environment-friendly board members of this Big Oil company.

== Early life and education ==
Karsner was born on George Air Force Base in Victorville, California – the youngest of four children – to David and Blanche Karsner. Each child was born on a separate Air Force base across three continents. The family ultimately settled in Fort Worth, Texas (Carswell Air Force Base, then southern wing of Strategic Air Command, 7th Bomb Wing) during the waning years of the Vietnam War and at the height of the Cold War.

Karsner's father was responsible for nuclear weaponry and played a key role in fulfilling the secret terms of the Kennedy-Khrushchev disarmament pact that resolved the 1963 “Missiles of October” Cuban Missile Crisis. Consequently, his father was deployed abroad, away from the family, for extended tours of duty. The family only learned the details of his assignments once they were declassified at the conclusion of the Cold War.

His mother, who was at the center the family and community life, was a well-regarded chef and caterer, and specialized in her native Moroccan cuisine. In addition to growing up during an era of mandatory bussing and desegregation, the Karsner home was multilingual and multicultural. As the child of a career military family, Karsner testified during his nomination to the Bush administration that he was imbued with an ethic that “our liberty comes with responsibilities and our opportunities imply an obligation” and “an appreciation of service above self.”

Before entering college, Karsner was a student of only public schools. He worked at night to save for college and attain academic scholarships, enabling him to be the first member of his family to graduate from a four-year institutions. He attended Southwest High School and was known for his political activism, both in student politics and in community and national affairs. He focused on nuclear arms reduction and addressing Soviet human rights violations. In 1984, he was elected by his peers as Youth Governor of Texas and was invited to meet President Ronald Reagan and other national leaders as part of the YMCA Youth and Government program.

Karsner attended Rice University, where he majored in political science and religious studies and graduated with honors in 1989. He then went on to study international Finance at the University of Hong Kong, earning a master's degree in Comparative Asian Studies.

== Career ==
=== Early years ===
Karsner began his career in energy in 1988 as an energy analyst and project manager for international development at Tondu Energy in Houston, Texas, a pioneering independent power producer. In 1994, he was hired as Senior Development Manager for Wärtsilä Power Development, based in Hong Kong. In 1999, Karsner moved to London, where he became founder and CEO of Enercorp, a wind power development firm and international agent of Vestas. In this capacity, Karsner was involved in project development, management, and financing of energy infrastructure.

In 2002, Karsner led Enercorp to win a global competition to develop the world's largest private wind farm outside the United States. He has also worked with prominent multinational energy firms and developers including ABB of Sweden, RES of the UK, and Tacke of Germany (now known as GE Wind).

Karsner was CEO of Manifest Energy, a firm committed to energy development, investment, and financing. Having experienced senior leadership roles in large corporations, entrepreneurial startups, government, finance, and diplomacy, he founded Manifest Energy Advisors to offer select clients in industry, utilities, manufacturing, and finance, timely strategic thought leadership in energy resources, technology, and policy.

=== United States Department of Energy (DOE) ===
On December 21, 2005, President George W. Bush nominated Karsner to the position of Assistant Secretary for Energy Efficiency & Renewable Energy at the U.S. Department of Energy. Karsner was unanimously confirmed by the U.S. Senate on March 16, 2006.

On March 23, 2006, Karsner was sworn in as the ninth Assistant Secretary for the Office of Energy Efficiency and Renewable Energy. In that role, Karsner managed the approximately $2 billion annual federal applied science, research and development portfolio for clean energy technologies. He also helped assemble significant bipartisan coalitions to implement or enact the Energy Policy Act, the Energy Independence and Security Act and the America COMPETES Act, all of which remain the foundation of comprehensive energy policy today.

Late in 2007, Karsner was approached by Maurice Kaya and William Parks, Jr., officers of the Department of Business, Economic Development & Tourism in Hawaii, about increasing the DOE's support role in Hawaii. Karsner was sympathetic to the request, and in January 2008, signed a comprehensive memorandum of understanding (MOU) with Governor Linda Lingle. This MOU established the Hawaii Clean Energy Initiative (HCEI) as a partnership between the state and the DOE. The HCEI's objective was to reduce Hawaii's oil dependence by 70% through substitution of renewable energy and energy-efficiency measures.

Karsner directed the U.S. Department of Energy and the Office of National Marine Sanctuaries toward an agreement calling for the two federal agencies to find ways to promote energy efficiency within their respective offices and facilities. Daniel J. Basta, director of the Office of National Marine Sanctuaries, and Karsner signed the agreement in Honolulu, expanding cooperative efforts to promote and increase energy efficiency at the country's national marine sanctuaries.

In diplomacy, Karsner was a principal contributor to the U.N.-sponsored climate change negotiations, the major economies meetings, and the Asia-Pacific Partnership on behalf of the U.S. He helped establish the "Bali Road Map" toward achieving a post-2012 global framework accord on energy security and emissions reduction. Karsner was also an original architect of the Major Economies Process.

=== Exploration ===
Karsner visited Antarctica from January 7–14, 2008, through the National Science Foundation's U.S. Antarctic Program, to promote wind and solar power. He dedicated a new scientific station at the geographic South Pole – the third since 1957 – officially ushering in a new support system for sophisticated large-scale experiments in disciplines ranging from astrophysics to environmental chemistry and seismology. This marked his second trip to South Pole station, as he also honeymooned there with his wife.

=== Other affiliations ===
In 2009, Karsner received the official insignia and designation of Royal Commander of the Polar Star - First Class from King Carl Gustav of Sweden, which is highest honor that the Kingdom of Sweden can bestow upon foreign nationals. The recognition was for "outstanding and unprecedented expansion of the historic ties" between the United States and Sweden in the fields of energy R&D, technology collaboration and commercialization, environment conservation and addressing climate change for Karsner's work at the DOE.

In 2012, Karsner attended the Bilderberg Meeting. This annual forum for informal discussions is designed to foster dialogue between Europe and North America. Karsner also chairs Aspen Energy Week – an annual convening of thought leaders across the energy industry – with Ernest Moniz, former United States Secretary of Energy. These two forums follow Chatham House Rules, in which participants agree not to reveal exactly what was said or who said it.

Karsner sits on several boards including Applied Materials (Nasdaq: AMAT), Conservation International, Nia Tero, the advisory council of the Natural Capital Project, the advisory board of the Energy Futures Initiative, the advisory board of MIT Media Lab., and the Board of Directors of ExxonMobil.

Karsner's 2021 election to the ExxonMobil Board of Directors made headlines because he was one of four candidates put forward by a coalition of activist investors led by Engine No. 1 with the aim of redirecting ExxonMobil's focus away from fossil fuels more toward less pollutive sources of energy.

== Honors ==
- Henry Crown Fellow, The Aspen Institute (2012)
- Royal Commander of the Order of the Polar Star – First Class, Sweden (2009)
- President's Award, U.S. Green Building Council (2008)
- Life Member, Council on Foreign Relations
- Fellow, Rotary International
- Hugh Scott Cameron Award as Outstanding Alumnus, Rice University
