= Elsie Wattie Lackey =

American bacteriologist

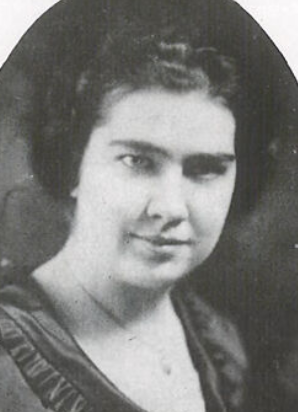
- Elsie Wattie, from the 1922 yearbook of Connecticut Agricultural College
- Born: Elsie Wattie; February 21, 1901; Worcester, Massachusetts, U.S.
- Died: April 16, 1992 (age 91); Florida, U.S.
- Other name: Elsie W. Lackey
- Occupations: Bacteriologist, botanist
- Spouse: James B. Lackey

Elsie Wattie Lackey (February 21, 1901 – April 16, 1992) was an American bacteriologist and botanist who worked for the United States Public Health Service (USPHS) in the 1930s and 1940s, and was later a researcher at the University of Florida. She often published with her husband, microbiologist James Bridges Lackey.

== Early life and education ==
Wattie was born in Worcester, Massachusetts, the daughter of William M. Wattie and Nellie Jane Wattie. Her father was a draftsman, inventor, and superintendent of a loom works, born in Canada. She graduated from Connecticut Agricultural College in 1923, and earned a master's degree there in 1925.

== Career ==
Wattie was first assigned to the Water and Sanitation Investigations Station of the USPHS in 1926. She worked in the agency's Stream Pollution Investigation Laboratory in the 1930s and 1940s. Later in her career she was a researcher while her husband was a professor at the University of Florida. She was a member of Sigma Xi and the American Public Health Association (APHA).

== Publications ==
Lackey's research was published in academic and technical journals including Sewage Works Journal, Public Health Reports, Journal of the American Water Works Association,The American Midland Naturalist, Quarterly Journal of the Florida Academy of Sciences, Microbiology, American Journal of Public Health, and Journal of the Marine Biological Association of the United Kingdom.

- "Studies of Sewage Purification: VIII. Observations on the Effect of Variations in the Initial Numbers of Bacteria and of the Dispersion of Sludge Flocs on the Course of Oxidation of Organic Material by Bacteria in Pure Culture" (1938, with C. T. Butterfield)
- "Studies of Sewage Purification: IX. Total Purification, Oxidation, Adsorption, and Synthesis of Nutrient Substrates by Activated Sludge" (1939, with C. C. Ruchhoft, C. T. Butterfield, and P. D. McNamee)
- "Studies of Sewage Purification: XIII. The Biology of Sphaerotilus Natans Kutzing in Relation to Bulking of Activated Sludge" (1940)
- "Studies of Sewage Purification: XV. Effective Bacteria in Purification by Trickling Filters" (1941, with C. T. Butterfield)
- "Cultural Characteristics of Zooglea-Forming Bacteria Isolated from Activated Sludge and Trickling Filters" (1942)
- "Oxidation-Reduction Studies: I. Oxidation-Reduction Potentials Developed by Pure Cultures in Sewage" (1942, with W. Allan Moore and C. C. Ruchhoft)
- "Influence of pH and Temperature on the Survival of Coliforms and Enteric Pathogens When Exposed to Free Chlorine" (1943, with C. T. Butterfield, Stephen Megregian, and C. W. Chambers)
- "Relative Resistance of Coliform Organisms and certain Enteric Pathogens to Excess-Lime Treatment" (1943, with Cecil W. Chambers)
- "Some Plankton Relationships in a Small Unpolluted Stream" (1943, with James B. Lackey, John F. Kachmar and Oliver R. Placak)
- "Coliform Confirmation from Raw and Chlorinated Waters with Brilliant Green Bile Lactose Broth" (1943)
- "Relative Resistance of Escherichia coli and Eberthella typhosa to Chlorine and Chloramines" (1944, with C. T. Butterfield)
- "Relative Productivity of Newer Coliform Media" (1948)
- "Some Visibility Problems in Large Aquaria, II: Bacteriological Study of the Sea Water Used in Marineland" (1956)
- "Effectiveness of iodine for the disinfection of swimming pool water" (1959, with Alvin P. Black and James B. Lackey)
- "The Habitat and Description of a New Genus of Sulphur Bacterium" (1961, with James B. Lackey)
- "Microscopic Algae And Protozoa In The waters near Plymouth in August 1962" (1963, with James B. Lackey)
- Taxonomy and ecology of the sulfur bacteria (1965, with James B. Lackey and George B. Morgan)
- A Partial Checklist of Florida Fresh-Water Algae and Protozoa with Reference to McCloud and Cue Lakes (1967, with James B. Lackey)

== Personal life ==
Wattie married her colleague, cytologist James Bridges Lackey, after 1950. Her husband died in 1982, and she died in Florida in 1992, at the age of 91.
