= Łąki, Garwolin County =

Łąki
- Village
- Location within Poland
- Coordinates: 51°51′23″N 21°44′32″E
- Country: Poland
- Voivodeship: Masovian
- County: Garwolin
- Gmina: Górzno

Łąki (Polish pronunciation: [ˈwɔŋkʲi]) is a village in the administrative district of Gmina Górzno, within Garwolin County, Masovian Voivodeship, in east-central Poland.
