= Andy Tait =

Scottish footballer

Personal information
- Full name: Andrew Tait
- Position: Wing half

Youth career
- Clydebank

Senior career*
Years	Team	Apps	(Gls)
1949–1954	Dumbarton	74	(9)
1953–1954	Dundee United	21	(1)
1954–1955	Clyde		
1954–1955	Albion Rovers	3	(0)
- * Club domestic league appearances and goals

Andrew Tait was a Scottish football player during the late 1940s / early 1950s. He signed 'senior' with Dumbarton in December 1949 and was a regular in the team for four seasons. He signed for Dundee United in September 1953.
