= Andy Bell (footballer, born 1984) =

English footballer

Personal information
- Full name: Andrew Bell
- Date of birth: 12 February 1984 (age 42)
- Place of birth: Blackburn, England
- Height: 5 ft 10 in (1.78 m)
- Position: Forward

Youth career
- 1994–2001: Blackburn Rovers

Senior career*
Years	Team	Apps	(Gls)
2001–2003	Blackburn Rovers	0	(0)
2003–2004	Wycombe Wanderers	11	(3)
2004	York City	10	(1)
2004–2006	Hednesford Town	57	(23)
2006–2010	Fleetwood Town		
2009–2010	→ Kendal Town (loan)		
2010	Guiseley	6	(0)
2010–2011	AFC Fylde		
2011–2012	Kendal Town		
2012	Radcliffe Borough		
2012–2015	Bamber Bridge		
2015–2016	Nelson	11	(3)
2016–	AFC Darwen		

International career
2000	England U16	5	(0)
- * Club domestic league appearances and goals as of 09:38, 17 April 2016 (UTC)

Andrew Bell (born 12 February 1984) is an English former footballer who played as a striker.

== Career ==
Born in Blackburn, Lancashire, Bell started his career with hometown club Blackburn Rovers at the age of 10 and signed a professional contract in February 2001 after nearly a decade in the youth system. He had a trial at Wycombe Wanderers in April 2003 and after being released by Blackburn in the summer he signed for Wycombe on a month-to-month contract in September, making his debut and scoring both goals in a 5–2 defeat to Oldham Athletic. His contract was extended until 29 February in January, before being released and joining York City on trial. He signed for York on non-contract terms on 1 March and made his debut in a 0–0 draw at Oxford United. His only goal for York came in a 3–1 defeat to Scunthorpe United, after he scored into an empty goal from a Stuart Wise long ball. He finished the 2003–04 season with 10 appearances and one goal for York as they were relegated to the Conference National.

He signed for Southern Football League Premier Division team Hednesford Town in August 2004 and scored on his debut. He was top goalscorer for the 2004–05 season with 20 goals in 36 appearances as the team won promotion to the Conference North and rejected a new contract in July to trial with League Two team Darlington. He re-signed for Hednesford after failing to secure a contract with Darlington.

Fleetwood Town of the Northern Premier League signed him in February 2006. Bell became Fleetwood's Top Scorer when they were crowned Northern Premier League Champions in the 2007–08 Season. He was transfer-listed following discussions with manager Micky Mellon in July 2009. Bell joined Kendal Town on a month's loan in November, which was extended to March 2010. Bell then moved to Guiseley AFC where he remained from March 2010 until July 2010.

He signed for AFC Fylde in Northern Premier League Division One North in July 2010. He played one season for the Coasters and signed for Kendal Town in July 2011. In January 2012 he joined Radcliffe Borough for just 3 months.

Bell currently plays for Bamber Bridge where he has been since March 2012. In the summer of 2015 he left Bamber Bridge to sign for North West Counties Football League Premier Division side Nelson.

== Personal life ==
His father is former player Norman Bell.

Andrew and his father Norman set up a Charity called Opportunity Sports Foundation http://www.opportunitysports.org The charity is aimed at helping disadvantaged young people in Lancashire. It follows the pairs involvement in youth work in the local area following their careers as footballers.

== Career statistics ==
Updated 12 December 2009.

Club	Season	League^{[A]}		FA Cup		League Cup		Other^{[B]}		Total	
Club	Season	Apps	Goals	Apps	Goals	Apps	Goals	Apps	Goals	Apps	Goals
Wycombe Wanderers	2003–04	11	3	1	0	0	0	1	0	13	3
York City	2003–04	10	1	0	0	0	0	0	0	10	1
Hednesford Town	2004–05	35	20	0	0	0	0	1	0	36	20
Hednesford Town	2005–06	22	3	1	0	0	0	0	0	23	3
Hednesford Town	Total	57	23	1	0	0	0	1	0	59	23
Fleetwood Town	2005–06	16	5	0	0	0	0	0	0	16	5
Fleetwood Town	2006–07	36	11	1	0	0	0	0	0	37	11
Fleetwood Town	2007–08	?	?	?	?	?	?	?	?	?	?
Fleetwood Town	2008–09	?	?	?	?	?	?	?	?	?	?
Fleetwood Town	2009–10	?	?	?	?	?	?	?	?	?	?
Fleetwood Town	Total	?	?	?	?	?	?	?	?	?	?
Kendal Town (loan)	2009–10	?	?	?	?	?	?	?	?	?	?
Career totals		?	?	?	?	?	?	?	?	?	?

== Footnotes ==
A. The "League" column constitutes appearances and goals (including those as a substitute) in the Football League, Football Conference, Northern Premier League and Southern Football League.
B. The "Other" column constitutes appearances and goals (including those as a substitute) in the Football League Trophy and play-offs.
