= Łąki, Warsaw West County =

Łąki
- Village
- Location within Poland
- Coordinates: 52°11′3″N 20°38′8″E
- Country: Poland
- Voivodeship: Masovian
- County: Warsaw West
- Gmina: Błonie
- Population: 29

Łąki (Polish pronunciation: [ˈwɔŋkʲi]) is a village in the administrative district of Gmina Błonie, within Warsaw West County, Masovian Voivodeship, in east-central Poland.
