= Łąki, Wołomin County =

Łąki
- Village
- Location within Poland
- Coordinates: 52°26′31″N 21°8′15″E
- Country: Poland
- Voivodeship: Masovian
- County: Wołomin
- Gmina: Radzymin

Łąki (Polish pronunciation: [ˈwɔŋkʲi]) is a village in the administrative district of Gmina Radzymin, within Wołomin County, Masovian Voivodeship, in east-central Poland.
