= Andy Lee (footballer, born 1962) =

English footballer

Personal information
- Full name: Andrew Gerard Lee
- Date of birth: 14 September 1962 (age 64)
- Place of birth: Liverpool, England
- Position: Defender

Youth career
- Stafford Rangers

Senior career*
Years	Team	Apps	(Gls)
1984–1985	Tranmere Rovers	18	(0)
1985–1986	Cambridge United	9	(0)
- Altrincham
Total		27	(0)

International career
1978	England Schoolboys	6	(0)
- * Club domestic league appearances and goals

Andy Lee (born 14 September 1962) is an English footballer who played as a defender in the Football League for Tranmere Rovers and Cambridge United.
