= Andy Lakey =

American painter

Andy Lakey (October 22, 1959 – October 4, 2012) was an American artist. He was best known for his 2000 paintings of angels, created between January 1, 1990, and December 31, 1999. He died on October 4, 2012, in Temecula, California.

== Early life and education ==
Lakey was born in Châteauroux, France. His birth name was Andrew Markivich. He moved to the United States in 1961.

After high school, Lakey joined and served in the US Navy and served on the USS Point Defiance in San Diego California. Lakey later donated some of his art works in 2009 to the military charity "Cirra's Cloud". He had no formal training in art.

== Career ==
By his late twenties, Lakey was working in auto sales. He became addicted to cocaine, and in 1986 he suffered a near-fatal drug overdose. The next day, he stopped using drugs, and instead began to draw pictures from his experiences.

In October 1989, Lakey left his auto sales job to pursue a full-time career as an artist.

In January 1990, Lakey experienced a vision in which he saw seven angels. The angels told him that he would have to paint angels, even though he had never picked up a paintbrush in his life. Based on this vision, he undertook to create 2000 paintings of angels, one for each year between the birth of Christ and the year 2000.

In 1998 author Keith Richardson wrote a book about Lakey's angel project, entitled Andy Lakey's Psychomanteum, published by Ventura Press.

Lakey typically used a bas relief technique, where the heavy, mixed media and paint is raised texturally from the canvas surface, This three-dimensionality makes these paintings "touchable art." Shortly thereafter, an art critic saw one of his paintings and Lakey became the subject of a story by a local ABC TV affiliate about art for the blind in San Diego.

ABC News commentator Peter Jennings of World News Tonight saw a local news story on Lakey’s art show in aid of the blind, and ran the story nationally; Jennings also requested one of the paintings from the artist, which was donated to the charity Lighthouse For The Blind in New York City.

An agent of musician Ray Charles read the ABC news story, and purchased one of Lakey's paintings for Charles. Later, in 2010, Lakey contributed the foreword to the Ray Charles biography, "You Don't Know Me: Reflections of My Father, Ray Charles," by Ray Charles (Jr.) Robinson and Mary Jane Ross, in which he further credited Charles’ influence upon his early career.

Lakey made donations of early angel paintings to the Blind Children's Center of Los Angeles. Another charity project involved exchanging some of his angel drawings for thousands of letters from children in the Murrieta school system pledging to live a drug-free life.

Lakey's works are in thousands of private collections, including those of Stevie Wonder, Ray Charles, Pope John Paul II, Ed Asner, Kelsey Grammer, Jimmy Carter, Gerald and Betty Ford, and Albert II, Prince of Monaco.

In 1998 Lakey completed the 2000 angel paintings, producing the last two works during 1999 in which Angel #2000 (an assemblage 20 feet by 10 feet in size, composed of 200 12” square paintings) was a montage of many smaller angels. He signed the final Angel at a public event in San Francisco, California, on New Year's Eve 2000.

In 1996, Lakey and Paul R. Walker published a book containing reproductions of 100 of his paintings.

In 1999, Lakey developed chronic health issues from overexposure to the toxins in his paint, resulting in multiple surgeries. He took a hiatus from his painting and began to work in video, as the subject of a video diary series shot in his studio.

After 2000, Lakey continued to work in mixed media on wood and also painted other collections; "One Heart," a collection of heart paintings, "Silhouettes And Shadows," special portraits and commissions using tracings of the heads and hands of his collectors, Abstracts (also known as the "Energy Paintings"), and flora and fauna color studies titled "Brilliant Nature".

In 2005, an 11-minute short art film "Silhouettes & Shadows", focusing on the textures in Lakey's abstract works, was independently produced by filmmaker Doug Brown. In 2006, his artwork was on display at a local gallery.

In May 2010, still under doctors’ supervision, Lakey began a new cycle of two-thousand Golden Angels, using 22-karat gold leaf applied to mixed media surfaces, and helped to launch a website featuring his Angel paintings.

The onset of hand tremors led him to simplify his style, developing an increasingly "minimalist" technique. In 2011-2012 he used this technique to produce a series titled "The Studies and Paintings". Lakey continued to paint, but wore protective gear for health reasons. On October 3, 2012, Lakey died due to complications after suffering a seizure.

Lakey’s personal story and artistic career have been covered on nationally televised syndicated and broadcast network programs, including ABC’s “World News Tonight” and “Good Morning America”, NBC’s “The Today Show”, CNN, Fox News, “Inside Edition”, “Hard Copy”. His story has also appeared in People Magazine.

Lakey's paintings have also been the subject of two art books published in Japan by Stepworks/Lightworks Press; Angel Magic 108, (2007) and Unencountered by Andrew Lakey (2009).
