= Andy Bell (footballer, born 1956) =

English footballer

Personal information
- Full name: Andrew Donald Bell
- Date of birth: 6 May 1956 (age 70)
- Place of birth: Taunton, England
- Position: Striker

Senior career*
Years	Team	Apps	(Gls)
?–1979	Taunton Town		
1979–1980	Exeter City	3	(0)
1980–1983	Yeovil Town	122	(36)
1983–1984	Weymouth	8	(1)
1984–1985	Paulton Rovers		
- * Club domestic league appearances and goals

Andrew Donald Bell (born 6 May 1956) is an English former footballer who played as a striker.

== Career ==
Born in Taunton, Somerset, Bell played for hometown club Taunton Town before signing for Exeter City in July 1979. He made three appearances in the Football League during the 1979–80 season before joining Yeovil Town. He made 122 appearances and scored 36 goals for Yeovil in the Alliance Premier League. He joined Weymouth in 1983, making eight appearances and scoring one goal in the 1983–84 season. He played for Paulton Rovers during the 1984–85 season.
