= Andy Lee (German musician) =

German musician

- Origin: Germany
- Genres: Rock 'n' roll
- Occupation: Musician
- Website: www.andylee.de

Andy Lee is a German musician who plays American piano rock 'n' roll music solo or with his backing band Tennessee Rain. In 2012, with other Hannover-based musicians, Lee took part in the release of HerzStücke a fund-raising CD for Hannover's children's hospital.

== Discography ==
- Put Your Cat Clothes On! (Rockhouse, 1992)
- Good Rockin' Teddy (Grunwald Records, 1994)
- Wild 'n' Rough - Live with Tennessee Rain (Grunwald Records, 1999)
