= Andy Bell (Scottish footballer) =

Scottish footballer

Personal information
- Full name: Andrew Bell
- Place of birth: Scotland
- Position: Wing half

Senior career*
Years	Team	Apps	(Gls)
- Troon
1948–1955	Queen's Park	78	(0)
- * Club domestic league appearances and goals

Andrew Bell was a Scottish amateur football wing half who played in the Scottish League for Queen's Park.
