= Łąki, Lublin Voivodeship =

Łąki
- Village
- Location within Poland
- Coordinates: 51°17′01″N 22°10′19″E
- Country: Poland
- Voivodeship: Lublin
- County: Puławy
- Gmina: Wąwolnica
- Time zone: UTC+1 (CET)
  - Summer (DST): UTC+2 (CEST)

Łąki (Polish pronunciation: [ˈwɔŋkʲi]) is a village in the administrative district of Gmina Wąwolnica, within Puławy County, Lublin Voivodeship, in eastern Poland.

== History ==
Six Polish citizens were murdered by Nazi Germany in the village during World War II.
