= Andy Marino (American writer) =

American writer of young-adult fiction (born 1980)

Andy Marino (born December 7, 1980) is an American writer of young-adult fiction, most known for his books Unison Spark, Uncrashable Dakota, and The Door.
He is widely held in libraries worldwide.

Marino was born and raised in Upstate New York, and currently lives in Queens.

His first book, Unison Spark was published by Henry Holt and Company on November 8, 2011 and it was reviewed by Publishers Weekly.

His second book, "Uncrashable Dakota" was published by Henry Holt and Company on November 12, 2013, and it was reviewed by Publishers Weekly.

His third book, "The Door" was published by Scholastic Corporation

His fourth book, "Autonomous" will be published by Disney Hyperion in 2017.
