= Łąki, West Pomeranian Voivodeship =

Łąki
- Village
- Location within Poland
- Coordinates: 53°10′4″N 16°24′41″E
- Country: Poland
- Voivodeship: West Pomeranian
- County: Wałcz
- Gmina: Wałcz
- Population: 100

Łąki (Polish pronunciation: [ˈwɔŋkʲi]) is a village in the administrative district of Gmina Wałcz, within Wałcz County, West Pomeranian Voivodeship, in north-western Poland. It lies approximately 12 km (7 mi) south of Wałcz and 125 km (78 mi) east of the regional capital Szczecin.

The village has a population of 100.
