= Andy Curran (footballer) =

English footballer (1898–1967)

Personal information
- Full name: Andrew Eltringham Curran
- Date of birth: 5 July 1898
- Place of birth: Ryton, Tyne and Wear, England
- Date of death: June 1967
- Place of death: Blackpool
- Height: 5 ft 8 1/2 in (1.74 m)
- Positions: Centre-half; right-half

Senior career*
Years	Team	Apps	(Gls)
- Mickley
1920	Sunderland	0	(0)
1921–1926	Blackpool	97	(3)
1926–1930	Accrington Stanley	136	(5)
- Lytham
- * Club domestic league appearances and goals

Andrew Eltrincham Curran (born 5 July 1898) was an English professional footballer. A centre-half or right-half, he played in the Football League for Sunderland, Blackpool and Accrington Stanley.

Curran began his career with local club Mickley, before joining Sunderland in 1920. After failing to make any League appearances for the Black Cats, he moved south to join Blackpool in 1921. He spent five years at Bloomfield Road, making 97 League appearances and scoring three goals. In 1926 he joined Accrington Stanley, with whom he remained for four years, clocking up 136 league appearances and scoring five goals. He finished his career back on the Fylde coast with Lytham.
