= Andrew J. Bell Jr. =

African-American civil rights activist

- Born: 1907
- Died: June 4, 2000
- Occupations: Civil rights activist, community leader, funeral director

Andrew J. Bell Jr. (1907-June 4, 2000), was an African American business owner, a funeral director, a community leader, and a civil rights activist. Bell was posthumously inducted into the Rhode Island Heritage Hall of Fame in 2007.

== Early life ==
Bell was born in 1907 in Providence, Rhode Island to Beatrice J. Bell (née Hinds) and Andrew J. Bell, a chef. He had 5 sisters. He graduated from Classical High School and took classes in Business Administration at Bryant College. He graduated from the New England Institute of Mortuary Science in Boston.

== Public service ==
Bell established his career-long business, Bell Funeral Home, on Westminster Street in Providence in 1932. The funeral home served the black community of Providence. In 1937, the funeral home moved to the Israel B. Mason House.

Bell was one of the founders of the Rhode Island Urban League in 1939, and with the League advocated for Black workers at Kaiser Shipyard at Field's point, opposed segregation in Providence housing projects the Roger Williams Housing Project and Codding Court in the 1950s. Bell served as a member of the Urban League's Board, and advisor to its Youth Council, and its president from 1947-1950.

In the 1950s, he was vice chairman of the RI Committee on Discrimination in Housing. He was also a member of the NAACP and vice president of their Providence branch.

In 1961, Bell was one of the delegates at the White House Conference on Aging. Bell was one of the founders of the Opportunities Industrialization Center office in the south side of Providence, Rhode Island in 1967. In 1993, Bell wrote An Assessment of Life in Rhode Island as an African American In the Era From 1918 to 1993.

== Awards and honors ==
Man of the Year, Urban League of Rhode Island, 1973.

Honorary doctorate from Rhode Island College in pedagogy.

Honorary doctorate in business administration from the University of Rhode Island.

Rhode Island Heritage Hall of Fame.2007.
