= Andoy (given name) =

Andoy is a Filipino given name found in Philippine English, a variant of Andy, a diminutive of various names.

== Persons ==
People with the given name include:

- Andoy Balunbalunan (1909–1944), Filipino actor
- Andoy Martinez (21st century), a Filipino politician who stood for election in the Philippine House of Representatives 2022 elections, for the Quezon 4th district
- Alejandro "Andoy" Moro (21st century), a Filipino politician who stood for election in the 2019 Zamboanga del Norte local elections
- Andoy Ranay (21st century), Filipino actor
- Rolando "Andoy" Remulla (21st century), incumbent Filipino politician in the 2016 Bacoor local elections
- Andoy Rosales (21st century), a Filipino politician who stood for election in the 2010 and 2019 Quezon City local elections

== Characters ==
- Andrea "Andoy", a female fictional character from the 2000s Philippine TV show Tabing Ilog
- Andoy, a fictional character from the 1987 Philippine film Vigilante (1987 film)
- Andoy, a fictional character from the 1998 Philippine film Ama Namin
- Andoy, a fictional character from the 2000s Philippine TV show Basta't Kasama Kita
- Andoy, a fictional character from the 2008 Philippine TV show Astigs
- Andoy, a fictional character from the 2008 Philippine TV show Luna Mystika
- Andoy, a fictional character from the 2009 Philippine TV show Eva Fonda
- Andoy, a fictional character from the 2010s Philippine TV show Imortal
- Andoy, a fictional character from the 2010s Philippine TV show Yagit (2014 TV series)
- Andoy, a fictional character from the Philippine 2011 Maalaala Mo Kaya season 19 TV show
- Andoy, a fictional character from the 2019 Philippine TV show The Gift (2019 Philippine TV series)
- Andoy, a fictional character from the 2020s Philippine TV show Walang Hanggang Paalam; see List of Walang Hanggang Paalam episodes
- Andoy, a fictional character from the 2020s Philippine TV show Niña Niño
- Andoy, a fictional character from the 2023 Philippine film Fin (2023 film)
- Andoy, a fictional character from the 2020s Philippine TV show Open 24/7 (TV series)
- Andoy, a fictional character, the main character of the Philippine komic comic book series Trese
- Andoy Aguirre, a fictional character from the 2010s Philippine TV show Magkano Ba ang Pag-ibig?
- Andrew "Andoy" Apostol, a fictional character from the 2019 Philippine TV show The General's Daughter (TV series)
- Andoy Batungbakal, a fictional character from the 2017 Philippine film Ang Panday (2017 film)
- Andoy Capuyao, a fictional character from the 2012 Philippine TV show Aryana (TV series)
- Andres "Andoy" dela Cruz, a fictional character from the 2017 Philippine TV show Meant to Be (Philippine TV series)
- Andrew "Andoy" Jimenez, a fictional character from the 2010s Philippine TV show Ikaw ay Pag-Ibig
- Andoy Martinez, a fictional character from the 2011 Philippine TV show Pahiram ng Isang Ina
- Andoy Nieva, a fictional character from the 2024 Philippine TV show Padyak Princess
- Andoy Ramos, a fictional character from the 2020 Philippine film The Boy Foretold by the Stars
- Constable Andres "Andoy" Torre Jr., a fictional character from 21st century Philippine TV show Ang Probinsyano season 2

== See also ==
- Andoy (disambiguation)
- Andy (disambiguation)
