= Andrew (disambiguation) =

Andrew is the English form of a given name in many countries.

Andrew may also refer to:

- Andrew the Apostle

== Places ==
=== United States ===
- Andrew (MBTA station), a train station in Boston, Massachusetts
- Andrew, Iowa, a city
- Andrew County, Missouri
- Andrew, West Virginia, an unincorporated community
- Port Andrew, Wisconsin, an unincorporated community

=== Canada ===
- Andrew, Alberta, a village

== Other ==
- Andrew (surname)
- Andy (given name)
- Andrew Corporation, manufacturer of antenna system hardware
- Andrew oilfield, in the UK sector of the North Sea
- Andrew Project, a Carnegie Mellon University computer project
  - Andrew File System, the project's file system
- HMS Andrew, names of three Royal Navy ships
- Hurricane Andrew, hurricane which struck the US in 1992
- "The Andrew", a nickname for the Royal Navy

== See also ==
- Andie
- Andrews (disambiguation)
- Andy (given name), including a list of people and fictional characters
- Andy (disambiguation)
- List of people with given name Andrew
- Prince Andrew (disambiguation)
- Saint Andrew (disambiguation)
- St. Andrew's Cross (disambiguation)
