= Ande =

Ande may refer to:

== Places ==
- Andes
- Ande Township (安德镇) in Pidu District, Chengdu, China
- Andé, a commune in the Eure department and Haute-Normandie region of France
- Andé, Ivory Coast, a town

== Other uses ==
- Atmospheric Neutral Density Experiment
- ANDE (Paraguay), national electric company of Paraguay
- Michael Ande (born 1944), German actor
- Georges Titre Ande, Congolese bishop

== See also ==
- And (disambiguation)
- Andes (disambiguation)
- Andi (disambiguation)
- Andy (disambiguation)
