= Ampersand (disambiguation) =

Ampersand is a typographical symbol (&).

Ampersand may also refer to:

== Fiction ==
- A fictional character from the science fiction novel Axiom's End
- A fictional character in the comic book series Y: The Last Man
- The fictional city Ampersand, setting of the webcomic Saturnalia
- Warren Ampersand, a character who is Jake the Dog's mechanical parent in the animated series Adventure Time

== Music ==
- "&", an album by Bastille, 2024
- "Ampersand", a song by Amanda Palmer from Who Killed Amanda Palmer, 2008
- "Ampersand", a song by Adrian Belew from Side One, 2005
- "Ampersand", a song by They Might Be Giants from My Murdered Remains, 2018

== Organizations ==
- Ampersand Network, a not-for-profit organization encouraging volunteering for young people in Australia
- Ampersand Capital Partners, former owner of Viracor-IBT Laboratories
- Ampersand Publishing, owner of Santa Barbara News-Press
- Ampersand (company), Rwandan electricity and electric vehicle company

== People ==
- Tammy Ampersand, stage name of singer-songwriter Kim Deal

== Places ==
- Ampersand Mountain, a mountain in New York State

== Publications ==
- Ampersand's Entertainment Guide, originally Ampersand, a college magazine supplement
- Ampersand (magazine), a student newspaper at Wyższa Szkoła Biznesu – National-Louis University
- Ampersand, an online magazine at the USC Annenberg School for Communication and Journalism
- The Ampersand, Eton College school magazine

== Other uses ==
- BAE Systems Ampersand, an unmanned autonomous flight system
- Bushey railway station, Hertfordshire, England, known as Ampersand in WWII

== See also ==
- & (disambiguation)
- And (disambiguation)
