= Andoy (disambiguation) =

Andoy is a village of the city of Namur located in the province of Namur, Wallonia, Belgium.

Andoy, Andøy, Andöy, Andœy or Andꝏy may also refer to:

== Places ==
=== Norway ===
- Andøya (Andøy Island), Andøy Municipality, Nordland County, Vesterålen Archipelago, Norway
- Andøy Municipality, Nordland, Vesterålen, Norway
- Andøy Bridge, Risøysundet Strait, Andøy Municipality, Norway; a bridge between the islands of Andøya and Hinnøya in the Vesterålen Archipelago

=== Belgium ===
- Fort d'Andoy (French: Andoy Fort), Namur, Walloonia, Belgium; a fortress

== People and characters ==
- Andoy (given name), persons and characters with the given name and nickname

=== Fictional characters ===
- Mang Andoy, a fictional character from the 1976 Philippine film Tatlong Taong Walang Diyos
- Mang Andoy, a fictional character from the 2004 Philippine film Spirit of the Glass
- Mang Andoy, a fictional character from the 2012 Philippine film My Kontrabida Girl

== Other uses ==
- Team Andoy, an electoral slate at the 2016 Bacoor local elections in Cavite, Philippines

== See also ==
- Andoya (disambiguation)
- Andy (disambiguation)
