= Prince Andrew (disambiguation) =

Prince Andrew is the former title of Andrew Mountbatten-Windsor (born 1960), second son of Queen Elizabeth II.

Prince Andrew may also refer to:

== People ==
- Prince Andrew Alexandrovich of Russia (1897–1981), second child of Grand Duke Alexander Mikhailovich
- Prince Andrew of Greece and Denmark (1882–1944), seventh child of George I of Greece and father of Prince Philip, Duke of Edinburgh
- Prince Andrew of Yugoslavia (1929–1990), third son of Alexander I of Yugoslavia
- Prince Andrew Romanoff (1923–2021), youngest child of Prince Andrei Alexandrovich
- Andrew Báthory (1563–1599), Prince-Bishop of Warmia, Prince of Transylvania
- Andrew of Hungary, Prince of Galicia (1210–1234)
- Andrey Yuryevich Bogolyubsky (died 1174), Saint Andrew, Prince of Bogolubovo, Prince of Vladimir-Suzdal
- Andrew, Prince of Volhynia (1102–1141), son of Vladimir II Monomakh, Grand Prince of Kyiv

== Places ==
- Prince Andrew High School, former name of Woodlawn High School, Dartmouth, Nova Scotia, Canada
- Prince Andrew School (Saint Helena), former name of St Helena Secondary School, Saint Helena, Atlantic, British Overseas Territories
- Prince Andrew Bridge, Novi Sad, Vojvodina, Serbia
- Prince Andrew Plateau, in the Queen Elizabeth Range, Antarctica

== Other uses ==
- Prince Andrew: The Musical, a 2022 British comedy musical telefilm

== See also ==
- Andrew Prince (fl. 21st c.), Canadian politician, multi-term councillor for Barrie City Council, Barrie, Ontario, Canada
- Andrew Prince, 2000 Mister South Africa
- Andrew Prince (died 1933), see List of people executed in the United States in 1933
- Prince Andrew School (disambiguation)
