= Andy =

Andy may refer to:

== People ==
- Andy (given name), including a list of real individuals and fictional characters
- Horace Andy (born 1951), Jamaican roots reggae songwriter and singer born Horace Hinds
- Katja Andy (1907–2013), German-American pianist and piano professor
- Leo Andy (born 1938), Guadeloupean politician
- Andy (singer) (born 1958), stage name of Iranian-Armenian singer Andranik Madadian

== Music ==
- Andy (1976 album), an album by Andy Williams
- Andy (2001 album), an album by Andy Williams
- Andy (Raleigh Ritchie album), a 2020 album by Raleigh Ritchie
- "Andy" (song), a 1986 song by Les Rita Mitsouko

== Other uses ==
- Andy (film), a 1965 film
- Andy (goose) (1987–1991), a sneaker-wearing goose born without webbed feet
- Andy (typeface), a monotype font

== See also ==
- Andrew
- List of people with given name Andrew
- Andy's
- Andee
- Andrew (disambiguation)
- Andrea (disambiguation)
- Andoy (disambiguation)
- And (disambiguation)
- Ande (disambiguation)
- Andi (disambiguation)
