= HMS Andrew =

Three ships of the Royal Navy have borne the name HMS Andrew:

- English ship Andrew (1417) was a carrack captured in 1417. She foundered in 1420.
- English ship St Andrew (1622) was a 42-gun ship launched in 1622. She was known as Andrew during the English Commonwealth, but returned to being named St Andrew after the Restoration. She was wrecked in 1666.
- HMS Andrew (P423) was an Amphion-class submarine launched in 1946 and broken up in 1977.

== See also ==
- HMS St Andrew
