= Andes (disambiguation) =

Andes may refer to:

== Places ==
- Andes, the world's longest mountain range, along the western coast of South America
- Andes, New York, a town in the US
- Andes (CDP), New York, a hamlet in the US
- Andes, Antioquia, a town and municipality in Colombia
- Andés, a parish in Asturias, Spain
- Andes (Italy), ancient town, place of birth of Virgil

== Acronym ==
- Architecture with non-sequential dynamic execution scheduling, a microprocessor architecture
- Public News Agency of Ecuador and South America (Spanish: Agencia Pública de Noticias del Ecuador y Suramérica), Ecuadorean state news agency
- Agua Negra Deep Experiment Site (ANDES), a proposed underground laboratory on the Argentina-Chile border

== Businesses ==
- Andes Líneas Aéreas, an Argentine airline company
- Andes Technology, a Taiwanese semiconductor company

== Other uses ==
- Andes (Andecavi), a people of ancient Gaul
- Andes chocolate mints, a chocolate mint candy
- Variant of the Illyrian name Andis
- RMS Andes (1939), an ocean liner

== See also ==
- Los Andes (disambiguation)
- Andean Community of Nations
- Antes (name)
- Ande (disambiguation)
- And (disambiguation)
