= @ (disambiguation) =

@ is the at sign, used for various purposes.

@ may also refer to:

- @ (album) by John Zorn and Thurston Moore in 2013
- @ (band), Stone Filipczak and Victoria Rose, American folk pop duo, formed 2020
- Arroba, a Portuguese, Catalan and Aragonese customary unit of weight, mass or volume (symbol "@")
- @, the X-SAMPA notation for a mid central vowel (ə in IPA)

== See also ==
- AT (disambiguation)
- & (disambiguation)
