= Education in Saint Helena, Ascension and Tristan da Cunha =

Education in a British Overseas Territory

This article describes education in Saint Helena, Ascension and Tristan da Cunha.

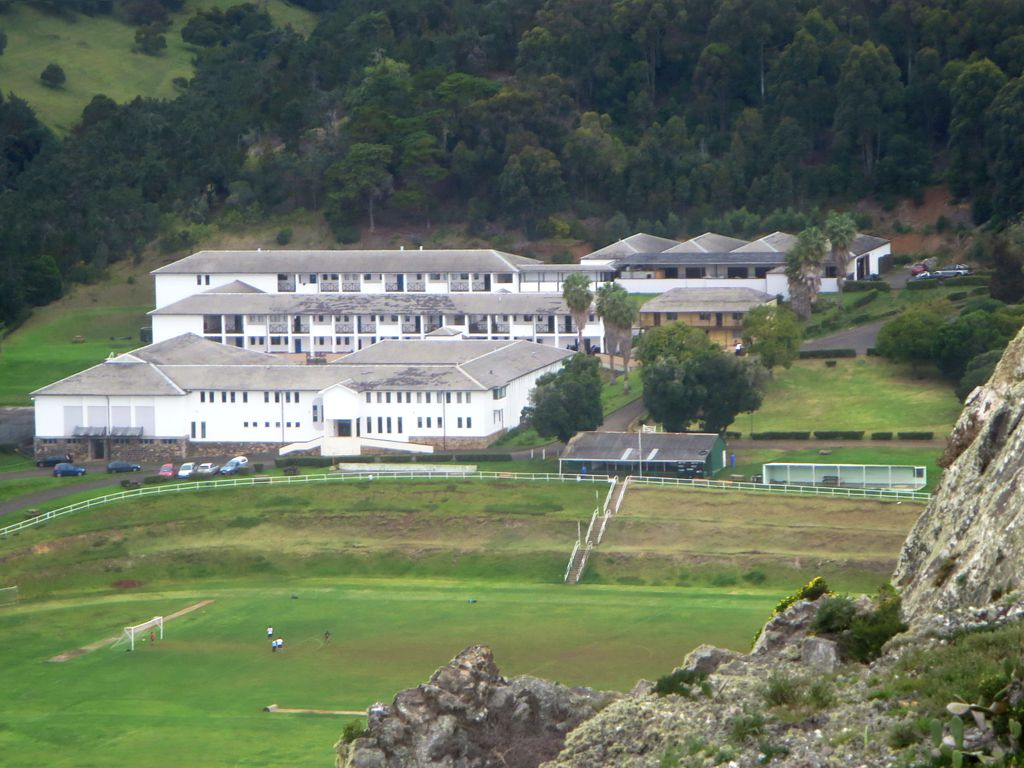
St Helena Secondary School

== Saint Helena ==
The Education and Employment Directorate, formerly the Saint Helena Education Department, in 2000 had its head office in The Canister in Jamestown. Education is free and compulsory between the ages of five and 16. At the beginning of the academic year 2009–10, 230 students were enrolled in primary school and 286 in secondary school. The island has three primary schools for students of age four to 11: Harford, Pilling, and St Paul's.

- St Paul's Primary School in St. Paul's, formerly St. Paul's Middle School, has both first and middle levels as it was formed by a 1 August 2000 merger. As of 2020 it has 134 students and serves, in addition to St. Paul's, Bluehill, Gordons Post, New Ground, Sandy Bay, and Upper Half Tree Hollow. In 2002, in addition to St. Paul's it served a portion of Half Tree Hollow as well as the communities of Blue Hill, Guinea Grass, Hunt's Bank, New Ground, Sandy Bay, Thompson's Hill, and Vaughn's.
- Harford Primary School in Longwood, with Governor James Harford as its namesake, opened as a senior school in 1957 and became Hardford Middle School in September 1988. It merged with Longwood First School in 2008. It It also serves Alarm Forest and Levelwood.
- Pilling Primary School is in Jamestown. Occupying a former garrison, the school was established in 1941 and became Pilling Middle School in 1988. Jamestown First School, located next door to Pilling Middle, merged into it in May 2005 as a result of declining enrollment. The merged school initially used both buildings, but as the enrollment continued its decline, the ex-Jamestown First Building, constructed in 1959, was no longer in use after 2007. In addition to Jamestown it serves Alarm Forest, Briars, Lower Half Tree Hollow, Rupert's, and Sea View. As of 2020 it had 126 students.

St Helena Secondary School (formerly Prince Andrew School) provides secondary education for students aged 11 to 18.

It formerly had separate first schools catering to younger students (ages 3–7 as of 2002):

- Half Tree Hollow First School, originally a primary school, opened as such in 1949 with its current name and year configuration in place since 1988. In addition to Half Tree Hollow it served Cleugh's Plain, New Ground, and Sapper Way.
- Jamestown First School, originally Jamestown Junior School, opened as such in 1959 with its current name and year configuration in place since 1988.
- Longwood First School, originally a primary school, opened in 1949 in a former mess hall for military officers that had been constructed in 1942; this building had an expansion in 1977, and there are four classrooms in a separate building that was built in 1958. Longwood became a "first school" in 1988.

The Education and Employment Directorate also offers programmes for students with special needs, vocational training, adult education, evening classes, and distance learning. The island has a public library (the oldest in the Southern Hemisphere, open since 1813) and a mobile library service which operates weekly in rural areas.

The English national curriculum is adapted for local use. A range of qualifications are offered – from GCSE, A/S and A2, to Level 3 Diplomas and VRQ qualifications:

GCSEs
- Design and Technology
- ICT
- Business Studies

A/S & A2 and Level 3 Diploma
- Business Studies
- English
- English Literature
- Geography
- ICT
- Psychology
- Maths
- Accountancy
VRQ
- Building and Construction
- Automotive Studies

Saint Helena has no tertiary education. Scholarships are offered for students to study abroad. St Helena Community College (SHCC) has some vocational and professional education programmes available.

== Ascension Island ==
The sole school of Ascension Island is Two Boats School.

== Tristan da Cunha ==
Education is fairly rudimentary; children leave school at age 16, and although they can take GCSEs, few do. The school on the island is St. Mary's School, which serves children from ages 4 to 16. The Naval Station had established a school building during World War II. The current facility opened in 1975 and has five classrooms, a kitchen, a stage, a computer room, and a craft and science room. Tristan students doing post-16 education receive assistance from the Tristan da Cunha Association Education Trust Fund and typically do so in England and South Africa.

The Tristan Song Project was a collaboration between St. Mary's School and amateur composers in Britain, led by music teacher Tony Triggs. It began in 2010 and involved St Mary's pupils writing poems and Tony Triggs providing musical settings by himself and his pupils. A desktop publication entitled Rockhopper Penguins and Other Songs (2010) embraced most of the songs completed that year and funded a consignment of guitars to the school. In February 2013, the Tristan Post Office issued a set of four Song Project stamps featuring island musical instruments and lyrics from Song Project songs about Tristan's volcano and wildlife. In 2014, the project broadened its scope and continues as the International Song Project.
