= Andøya (disambiguation) =

Andøya is an island in Andøy Municipality of Norway.

Andøya may also refer to:

- Andøy Municipality, a Norwegian municipality which covers the island and other areas
- Andøya Space, a rocket launch site, rocket range, and spaceport on Andøya island of Andøy Municipality
- Andøya Air Station, a military base on the island of Andøya in Andøy Municipality
- Andøya Airport, Andenes, an airport in Andøy Municipality, Norway
- Andøya, Agder, an island in Kristiansand, Norway

== See also ==
- Andoy (disambiguation)
