= HMS St Andrew =

Three ships of the Royal Navy have borne the name HMS St Andrew, after Saint Andrew, patron saint of Scotland:

- English ship St Andrew (1596) was a 50-gun galleon captured from the Spanish in 1596 and given away in 1604.
- English ship St Andrew (1622) was a 42-gun great ship (subsequently second rate) launched in 1622. She was known as Andrew during the Commonwealth, but regained her original name after the Restoration. She was wrecked in 1666.
- HMS St Andrew (1670) was a 96-gun first-rate ship of the line launched in 1670. She was renamed HMS Royal Anne in 1703 and rebuilt as a 100-gun first rate. She was broken up in 1727, but remained listed until 1756.
