= And 1 =

And One is a German synthpop group.

And 1, And I and similar may refer to:

== Astronomy ==
- Andromeda I, a dwarf spheroidal galaxy
- 1 And, another name for the star system Omicron Andromedae
- ι And, another name for the star Iota Andromedae

== Other uses ==
- AND1, an American athletic shoe company
- And-1, a three-point play or four-point play in basketball
- "And I", a song by Ciara
- "And I", a song by Boyzone from their 1998 album Where We Belong

== See also ==
- Andi (disambiguation)
