= Andoy =

- Village of Namur
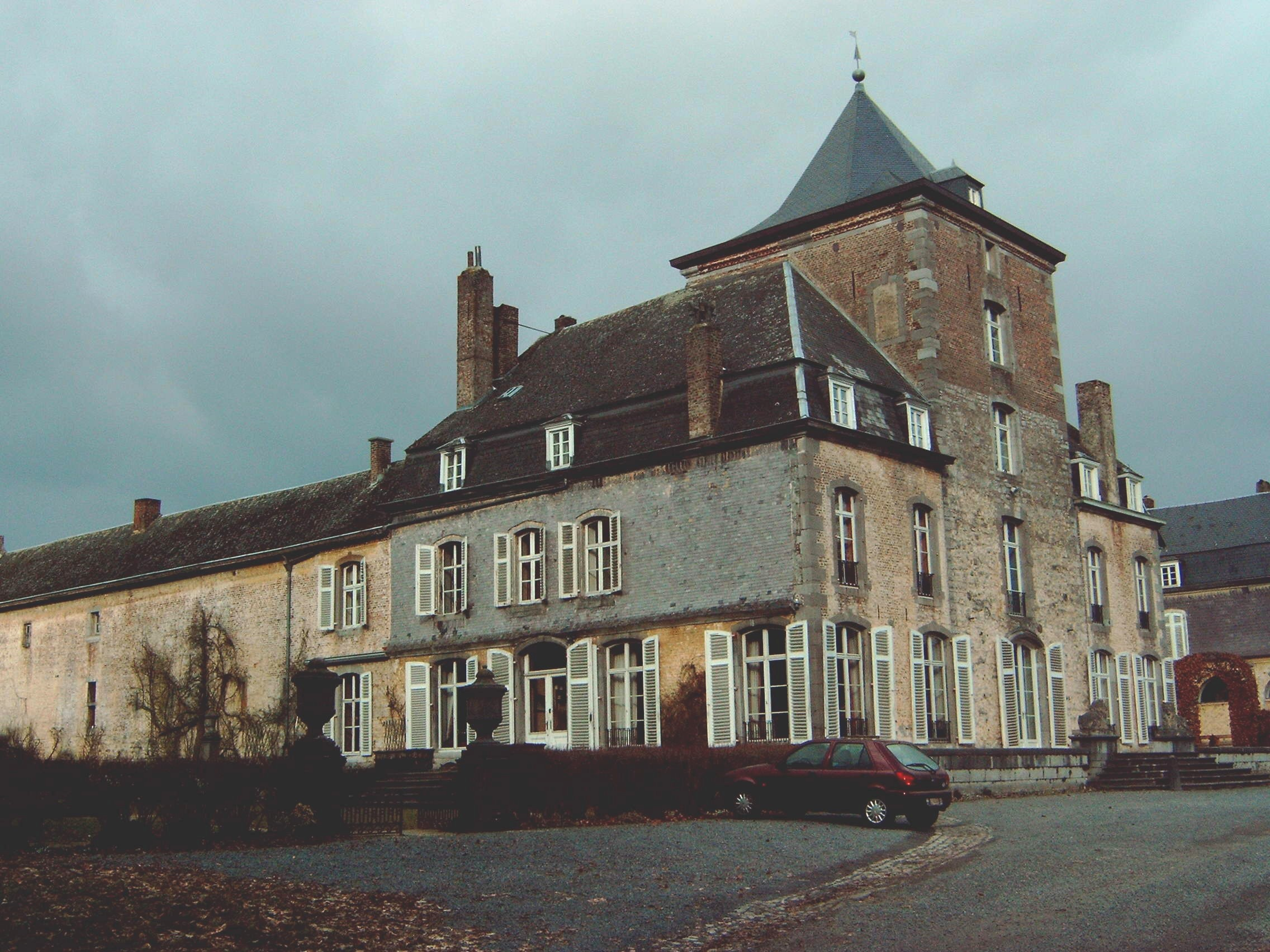
- Château of Andoy
- Interactive map of Andoy
- Location within Belgium Location within Namur Province
- Coordinates: 50°26′00″N 4°56′00″E
- Country: Belgium
- Community: French Community
- Region: Wallonia
- Province: Namur
- Arrondissement: Namur
- Municipality: Namur
- Postal codes: 5100
- Area codes: 081

Andoy (French pronunciation: [ɑ̃dwa]) is a village of the city of Namur located in the province of Namur, Wallonia, Belgium. Andoy was a separate municipality for a short time, between 1795 and 1808, until it was merged to Wierde. On 1 January 1977, Wierde was merged into Namur.

The late 19th-century Fort d'Andoy is located here.
