= & (disambiguation) =

&, or ampersand, is a typographic symbol.

& may also refer to:

== Music ==
- & (album), by Julien Doré
- "&", a 2024 album by Bastille
- & (Ayumi Hamasaki EP), a 2003 EP by Ayumi Hamasaki
- & (The Moth & The Flame EP), an EP by rock group The Moth & The Flame
- "&", a rock song by Tally Hall on the 2011 album Good & Evil
- &, a 2021 EP by Eric Church, released as part of his Heart & Soul triple album
- [&] (Loona EP), a 2021 EP by South Korean girl group Loona

== Computing ==
- Bitwise and
- Operators in C and C++

== Other ==
- & (theatre), in Espoo, Finland
- &, a 1925 poetry collection by E.E. Cummings

== See also ==
- Iain Baxter& (born 1936), Canadian conceptual artist
- Ampersand (disambiguation)
- And (disambiguation)
