= Prince Andrew School =

Prince Andrew School may refer to:

- Prince Andrew School (Saint Helena), former name of St Helena Secondary School, Saint Helena, British Overseas Territories
- Prince Andrew High School, former name of Woodlawn High School, Dartmouth, Nova Scotia, Canada
