= Los Andes =

Los Andes may refer to:

== Places ==
- The Andes, a mountain range in South America
- Los Andes Department, Salta Province, Argentina
- National Territory of Los Andes, a former national territory of Argentina that has since been incorporated into Catamarca, Jujuy and Salta provinces
- Los Andes Province (Bolivia), La Paz Department
- Los Andes, Chile, a city and commune in Los Andes Province, Valparaíso Region, Chile
- Los Andes Province, Chile, Valparaíso Region, Chile
- Los Andes, Nariño, a town and municipality in Nariño Department, Colombia

== Other uses ==
- ARA Los Andes, an Argentine Navy vessel, active 1875–1927
- Club Atletico Los Andes, a football club based in Lomas de Zamora, Argentina
- C.D. Los Andes, a football club based in San Jorge, San Miguel, El Salvador
- Los Andes de Lomas de Zamora, a football club based in Greater Buenos Aires, Argentina
- Los Andes (Argentine newspaper), a daily newspaper published in Mendoza, Argentina
- Universidad de los Andes (disambiguation)

== See also ==
- Andes (disambiguation)
