= Dogger (boat) =

Type of fishing boat originating in the Netherlands

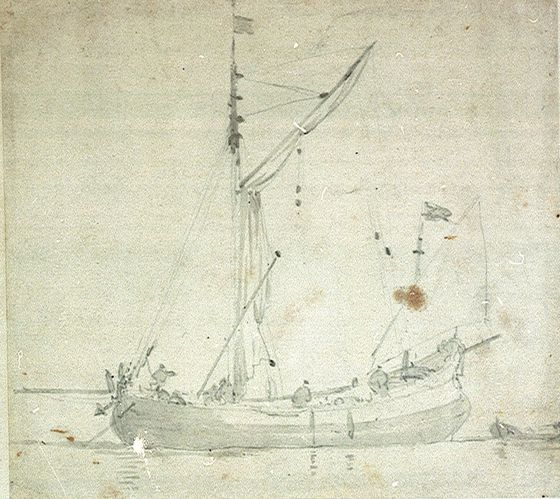
A dogger viewed from before the port beam. Her gaff mainsail is brailed up and her lateen mizzen is set. c. 1675 by Willem van de Velde the Younger

The dogger (Dutch pronunciation: [dɔɣər]) was a group of similar fishing boats, described as early as the fourteenth century, that commonly operated in the North Sea. Early examples were single-masted and were largely used for fishing for cod by rod and line. By the seventeenth century, two-masted doggers were common and were using trawl nets. Doggers were slow but sturdy vessels, capable of fishing in the rough conditions of the North Sea.

== Name ==
The boats were used for fishing for cod, now called kabeljauw in Dutch, but in that era the name dogge or doggevis was more common. Dutch boats were ubiquitous in the North Sea, and the word dogger was given to the rich fishing grounds where they often fished, which became known as the Dogger Bank. The sea area in turn gave its name to the later design of boat that commonly fished that area, and so became associated with this specific design rather than the generic Dutch trawlers.

== Design ==
The dogger was a development of the ketch. It was gaff-rigged on the main-mast, and carried a lug sail on the mizzen, with two jibs on a long bowsprit. The boats were generally short, wide-beamed and small, and were used for trawling or line fishing on the Dogger Bank. The name "dogger" was effectively synonymous with ketch from the early seventeenth century, until the ketch began to increase in size during the period, eventually rising above 50 tons in the middle of the century.

Doggers were considerably smaller vessels in comparison, usually displacing around 13 tonnes, and carrying around a tonne of bait, three tonnes of salt, and half a tonne each of food and firewood for the crew. Around six tonnes of fish could therefore be carried. They would generally have been around 50 feet (15 m) long, with a maximum beam of 15 feet (4.6 m), and a draught of about 5 feet (1.5 m). They had a rudder rather than a steering oar, and high sides. A decked area forward probably provided limited accommodation for the crew, as well as a storage and cooking area, with a similar area aft. There would have been two small anchors, and one main anchor to allow for extended periods fishing in the same spot, in waters up to 60 feet (18 m) deep. The dogger would also have carried a small open boat to maintain the lines and serve as a tender.

== Significance ==
Doggers were slow but sturdy vessels, capable of fishing in the rough conditions of the North Sea. Some doggers were even used as military vessels, and fitted with cannon. The Royal Navy was one such operator, using doggers as support vessels during the seventeenth century. They could also be used for short trading voyages, ranging into the English Channel. In 1646, during the English Civil War, the Parliamentary commander of the ship Andrew, a man named W. Batten, wrote to his superior

Sir, I believe the castle of Pendennis will not be long out of our hands; a dogger boat with four guns I have taken, whereof one Kedgwin of Penzant was captain, a notable active knave against the Parliament, and had the King's commission; and now would fain be a merchant man, and was balasted with salt and had divers letters in her for Pendennis castle.

== See also ==
- Herring buss
