= Results of the 2022 Philippine House of Representatives elections by congressional district =

- May 9, 2022
- All 316 seats to the House of Representatives of the Philippines; 159 seats needed for a majority

The following are the results of the 2022 Philippine House of Representatives elections by congressional district.

== Abra ==
Candidate	Party	Votes	%
Menchie Beronilla-Bernos	Nacionalista Party	122,344	100.00
Total		122,344	100.00

== Agusan del Norte ==
=== 1st District ===
Candidate	Party	Votes	%
Jose Aquino II	Lakas–CMD	77,250	45.25
Arcedel I. Libarios	People's Reform Party	72,347	42.38
Ronel M. Azarcon	PDP–Laban	21,123	12.37
Total		170,720	100.00

=== 2nd District ===
Candidate	Party	Votes	%
Dale Corvera	PDP–Laban	145,947	78.75
Jofe Magallanes A. Atenta-Roquero	People's Reform Party	39,385	21.25
Total		185,332	100.00

== Agusan del Sur ==
=== 1st District ===
Candidate	Party	Votes	%
Alfelito M. Bascug	National Unity Party	119,773	100.00
Total		119,773	100.00

=== 2nd District ===
Candidate	Party	Votes	%
Adolph Edward G. Plaza	National Unity Party	144,042	100.00
Total		144,042	100.00

== Aklan ==
=== 1st District ===
Candidate	Party	Votes	%
Carlito Marquez	Nationalist People's Coalition	89,731	55.59
Rodell R. Ramos	National Unity Party	59,110	36.62
Harry C. Sucgang	Aksyon Demokratiko	9,710	6.02
Rodson F. Mayor	Independent	2,863	1.77
Total		161,414	100.00

=== 2nd District ===
Candidate	Party	Votes	%
Teodorico Haresco Jr.	Nacionalista Party	134,436	87.43
Virgilita Mationg-Pamatian	Independent	11,130	7.24
Matias A. Wacan	Independent	8,206	5.34
Total		153,772	100.00

== Albay ==
=== 1st District ===
Candidate	Party	Votes	%
Edcel Lagman	Liberal Party	169,139	87.18
Rebecca M. Quijano	Independent	17,420	8.98
Hernando B. Bruce	Philippine Green Republican Party	4,275	2.20
Adela Pleshette B. Villar	Independent	3,175	1.64
Total		194,009	100.00

=== 2nd District ===
Candidate	Party	Votes	%
Jose Ma. Clemente S. Salceda	PDP–Laban	225,851	94.16
Virgilio A. Goyena	Independent	5,677	2.37
Carmelo Redencion T. de Leoz Jr	Partido Lakas ng Masa	4,427	1.85
Danilo L. Maravillas	Katipunan ng Kamalayang Kayumanggi	2,295	0.96
Domingo A. Arao	Independent	1,614	0.67
Total		239,864	100.00

=== 3rd District ===
Candidate	Party	Votes	%
Fernando Cabredo	National Unity Party	165,111	100.00
Total		165,111	100.00

== Antipolo ==
=== 1st District ===
Candidate	Party	Votes	%
Roberto Puno	National Unity Party	132,007	93.87
Salvador Raldy R. Abaño	Independent	5,162	3.67
Javez M. Tibio	Independent	3,460	2.46
Total		140,629	100.00

=== 2nd District ===
Candidate	Party	Votes	%
Romeo Acop	National Unity Party	132,896	100.00
Total		132,896	100.00

== Antique ==
Candidate	Party	Votes	%
Antonio Agapito B. Legarda Jr	Nationalist People's Coalition	189,907	63.55
Paolo Everardo S. Javier	PDP–Laban	69,299	23.19
Abdiel Dan Elijah S. Fajardo	Liberal Party	28,848	9.65
Joel M. Javier Sr	PDP–Laban	10,755	3.60
Total		298,809	100.00

== Apayao ==
Candidate	Party	Votes	%
Eleanor Bulut Begtang	PDP–Laban	50,503	100.00
Total		50,503	100.00

== Aurora ==
Candidate	Party	Votes	%
Rommel T. Angara	Laban ng Demokratikong Pilipino	103,147	100.00
Total		103,147	100.00

== Bacolod ==
Candidate	Party	Votes	%
Greg Gasataya	Nationalist People's Coalition	185,470	69.14
Daniel Alfonso N. Atayde	Independent	80,591	30.04
Narciso A. San Miguel	Pederalismo ng Dugong Dakilang Samahan	850	0.32
Romy G. Gustilo	Independent	738	0.28
Wilfredo F. David	Independent	618	0.23
Total		268,267	100.00

== Baguio ==
Candidate	Party	Votes	%
Marquez Go	Nacionalista Party	99,372	75.11
Nicasio M. Aliping Jr.	Independent	30,156	22.79
Edgardo L. Duque	Independent	982	0.74
Rafael S. Wasan	Pederalismo ng Dugong Dakilang Samahan	729	0.55
Reynaldo Zeta Diaz Jr.	Independent	689	0.52
Alexis A. Toribio	Independent	375	0.28
Total		132,303	100.00

== Basilan ==
Candidate	Party	Votes	%
Mujiv Hataman	Basilan Unity Party	137,976	67.57
Yasmeen L. Junaid	United Bangsamoro Justice Party	64,555	31.61
Abdulhan U. Jaujohn	Independent	874	0.43
Mohammad Alih M. Samiun	Pederalismo ng Dugong Dakilang Samahan	790	0.39
Total		204,195	100.00

== Bataan ==
=== 1st District ===
Candidate	Party	Votes	%
Geraldine Roman	Lakas–CMD	107,496	100.00
Total		107,496	100.00

=== 2nd District ===
Candidate	Party	Votes	%
Albert Raymond S. Garcia	National Unity Party	128,222	78.94
Eliza Ann S. Roque	PROMDI	34,201	21.06
Total		162,423	100.00

=== 3rd District ===
Candidate	Party	Votes	%
Maria Angela Garcia	National Unity Party	102,488	58.25
Angel V. Periglorio Jr	Partido Demokratiko Sosyalista ng Pilipinas	73,465	41.75
Total		175,953	100.00

== Batanes ==
Candidate	Party	Votes	%
Ciriaco Gato Jr.	Nationalist People's Coalition	3,872	33.92
Luis Andres R. Abad	Liberal Party	3,037	26.61
Ronald P. Aguto Jr.	Partido para sa Demokratikong Reporma	2,484	21.76
Carlo Oliver Diasnes	Lakas–CMD	2,022	17.71
Total		11,415	100.00

== Batangas ==
=== 1st District ===
Candidate	Party	Votes	%
Eric Buhain	Nacionalista Party	143,705	45.29
Elisa R. Ermita-Abad	Nationalist People's Coalition	127,545	40.19
Gerardo R. Manalo	Partido Pilipino sa Pagbabago	42,233	13.31
Luisito L. Ruiz	Ang Kapatiran	3,839	1.21
Total		317,322	100.00

=== 2nd District ===
Candidate	Party	Votes	%
Gerville Luistro	Nationalist People's Coalition	71,832	43.21
Ma. Reina D. Abu	Nacionalista Party	68,208	41.03
Nicanor M. Conti	PDP–Laban	26,193	15.76
Total		166,233	100.00

=== 3rd District ===
Candidate	Party	Votes	%
Maria Theresa Collantes	Nationalist People's Coalition	224,710	60.93
Mary Angeline Halili	Pederalismo ng Dugong Dakilang Samahan	106,977	29.01
Gerry C. Natanauan	Independent	31,103	8.43
Nestor L. Burgos	Independent	5,981	1.62
Total		368,771	100.00

=== 4th District ===
Candidate	Party	Votes	%
Lianda Bolilia	Nacionalista Party	184,163	73.06
Victor P. Portugal Jr	Nationalist People's Coalition	67,915	26.94
Total		252,078	100.00

=== 5th District ===
Candidate	Party	Votes	%
Mario Vittorio A. Mariño	Nacionalista Party	156,530	91.98
Carlito D. Bisa	Ang Kapatiran	13,645	8.02
Total		170,175	100.00

=== 6th District ===
Candidate	Party	Votes	%
Ralph Recto	Nacionalista Party	161,540	100.00
Total		161,540	100.00

== Benguet ==
Candidate	Party	Votes	%
Eric Yap	United Benguet Party	123,801	61.40
Victorio T. Palangdan	Kilusang Bagong Lipunan	71,200	35.31
Samson C. Paran	Independent	4,457	2.21
Thorrsson M. Keith	Independent	2,162	1.07
Total		201,620	100.00

== Biliran ==
Candidate	Party	Votes	%
Gerardo Espina Jr.	Lakas–CMD	74,502	100.00
Total		74,502	100.00

== Biñan ==
Candidate	Party	Votes	%
Marlyn B. Alonte-Naguiat	PDP–Laban	116,376	69.68
Michael Gerard Thomas P. Yatco	Partido Federal ng Pilipinas	50,627	30.32
Total		167,003	100.00

== Bohol ==
=== 1st District ===
Candidate	Party	Votes	%
Edgar Chatto	National Unity Party	160,647	70.95
Fabio J. Ontong Jr.	Nationalist People's Coalition	36,638	16.18
Marybelle P. de la Serna	Independent	29,153	12.87
Total		226,438	100.00

=== 2nd District ===
Candidate	Party	Votes	%
Ma. Vanessa C. Cadorna-Aumentado	People's Reform Party	138,266	56.89
Jovanna C. Jumamoy	National Unity Party	92,728	38.16
Gerardo C. Garcia	Pwersa ng Masang Pilipino	10,642	4.38
Ramil P. Melencion	Lakas–CMD	828	0.34
Marcos G. Auza	Independent	558	0.23
Total		243,022	100.00

=== 3rd District ===
Candidate	Party	Votes	%
Kristine Alexie T. Besas-Tutor	Nacionalista Party	167,359	65.03
Ma. Katrina L. Lim	PDP–Laban	88,686	34.46
Roger S. Cadorniga	Labor Party Philippines	1,326	0.52
Total		257,371	100.00

== Bukidnon ==
=== 1st District ===
Candidate	Party	Votes	%
Jose Manuel Alba	Bukidnon Paglaum	90,190	58.98
Juan Romeo Nereus O. Acosta	Independent	61,508	40.22
Andres A. Eligan Jr	Labor Party Philippines	1,229	0.80
Total		152,927	100.00

=== 2nd District ===
Candidate	Party	Votes	%
Jonathan Keith Flores	Nacionalista Party	118,031	62.71
Richard D. Macas	Bukidnon Paglaum	70,192	37.29
Total		188,223	100.00

=== 3rd District ===
Candidate	Party	Votes	%
Jose Maria Zubiri Jr.	Bukidnon Paglaum	128,887	57.50
Arlyn P. Ayon	People's Reform Party	92,857	41.42
George E. Paña	Independent	1,024	0.46
Rey B. Cabaraban	Labor Party Philippines	766	0.34
Alberto C. Ramilo	Partido Federal ng Pilipinas	632	0.28
Total		224,166	100.00

=== 4th District ===
Candidate	Party	Votes	%
Laarni Roque	Nacionalista Party	95,837	67.10
Oliver Owen L. Garcia	Bukidnon Paglaum	46,997	32.90
Total		142,834	100.00

== Bulacan ==
=== 1st District ===
Candidate	Party	Votes	%
Danilo A. Domingo	National Unity Party	202,712	58.21
Jose Antonio Sy-Alvarado	PDP–Laban	140,798	40.43
Marc Hubert M. de Guzman	Reform	4,748	1.36
Total		348,258	100.00

=== 2nd District ===
Candidate	Party	Votes	%
Augustina Dominique C. Pancho	National Unity Party	137,276	80.64
Fidel L. Bermudez	Nationalist People's Coalition	24,936	14.65
Jaime E. Villafuerte	Independent	4,746	2.79
Antonio E. Deborja	Independent	3,277	1.92
Total		170,235	100.00

=== 3rd District ===
Candidate	Party	Votes	%
Lorna F. Cillian-Silverio	National Unity Party	143,698	69.07
Jesus Y. Viceo	Aksyon Demokratiko	61,528	29.58
Arnaldo A. Villena	Independent	2,811	1.35
Total		208,037	100.00

=== 4th District ===
Candidate	Party	Votes	%
Linabelle Ruth R. Villarica	PDP–Laban	180,067	91.01
Raquel Guardiano-Miguel	Aksyon Demokratiko	11,476	5.80
Ferdinand P. Victolero	People's Reform Party	6,303	3.19
Total		197,846	100.00

=== 5th District ===
Candidate	Party	Votes	%
Ambrosio Cruz Jr.	PDP–Laban	128,065	53.15
Arnel C. Alcaraz	National Unity Party	112,899	46.85
Total		240,964	100.00

=== 6th District ===
Candidate	Party	Votes	%
Salvador Pleyto	PDP–Laban	81,307	37.68
Alfredo G. Germar	National Unity Party	76,430	35.42
Ma. Klarissa Martinez-Daly	Liberal Party	51,491	23.86
Ramon Carlos R. Villarama	Aksyon Demokratiko	5,141	2.38
Jose G. Mangulabnan Jr	Independent	828	0.38
Ernesto M. Padernos	Independent	595	0.28
Total		215,792	100.00

== Cagayan ==
=== 1st District ===
Candidate	Party	Votes	%
Ramon C. Nolasco Jr.	Nationalist People's Coalition	115,801	57.35
Katrina Gloria C. Ponce Enrile	Lakas–CMD	77,116	38.19
Roberto M. Damian	Nacionalista Party	9,005	4.46
Total		201,922	100.00

=== 2nd District ===
Candidate	Party	Votes	%
Baby Aline Vargas-Alfonso	Lakas–CMD	123,428	89.63
James Bryan C. Sacramed	Nacionalista Party	12,515	9.09
Melvin E. Capili	Partido Federal ng Pilipinas	1,766	1.28
Total		137,709	100.00

=== 3rd District ===
Candidate	Party	Votes	%
Joseph Lara	PDP–Laban	147,669	65.17
Mabel V. Mamba	Nacionalista Party	78,033	34.44
Gonzalo M. Jugarap	Independent	894	0.39
Total		226,596	100.00

== Cagayan de Oro ==
=== 1st District ===
Candidate	Party	Votes	%
Lordan Suan	Padayon Pilipino	76,832	54.10
Raineir Joaquin V. Uy	National Unity Party	63,567	44.76
Tito Noel A. Mora	Bagumbayan–VNP	1,607	1.13
Total		142,006	100.00

=== 2nd District ===
Candidate	Party	Votes	%
Rufus Rodriguez	Centrist Democratic Party of the Philippines	128,134	84.58
Irene L. Floro	People's Reform Party	23,365	15.42
Total		151,499	100.00

== Calamba ==
Candidate	Party	Votes	%
Charisse Anne Hernandez	PDP–Laban	113,130	50.09
Justin Marc S. Chipeco	Nacionalista Party	105,723	46.81
Emerson S. Panganiban	Independent	6,981	3.09
Total		225,834	100.00

== Caloocan ==
=== 1st District ===
Candidate	Party	Votes	%
Oscar G. Malapitan	Nacionalista Party	195,705	74.27
Marylou Z. Nubla-San Buenaventura	Aksyon Demokratiko	63,604	24.14
Violeta B. dela Cruz	Independent	4,207	1.60
Total		263,516	100.00

=== 2nd District ===
Candidate	Party	Votes	%
Mary Mitzi L. Cajayon-Uy	PDP–Laban	63,669	35.20
Roberto R. Samson	Lakas–CMD	41,057	22.70
Luis Macario E. Asistio	Nationalist People's Coalition	28,603	15.81
Alexander V. Mangasar	Partido para sa Demokratikong Reporma	26,870	14.86
Jacob Reuben A. Cabochan	Aksyon Demokratiko	20,672	11.43
Total		180,871	100.00

=== 3rd District ===
Candidate	Party	Votes	%
Dean Asistio	PDP–Laban	54,319	55.79
Enrico R.Echiverri	Pederalismo ng Dugong Dakilang Samahan	43,044	44.21
Total		97,363	100.00

== Camarines Norte ==
=== 1st District ===
Candidate	Party	Votes	%
Josefina Tallado	PDP–Laban	79,882	51.69
Catherine Barcelona-Reyes	National Unity Party	74,662	48.31
Total		154,544	100.00

=== 2nd District ===
Candidate	Party	Votes	%
Rosemarie Panotes	PDP–Laban	96,270	62.15
Renato J. Unico Jr	Lakas–CMD	58,640	37.85
Total		154,910	100.00

== Camarines Sur ==
=== 1st District ===
Candidate	Party	Votes	%
Tsuyoshi Anthony G. Horibata	PDP–Laban	58,098	52.98
Maria Belen G. Andaya-Eusebio	Nationalist People's Coalition	51,555	47.02
Total		109,653	100.00

=== 2nd District ===
Candidate	Party	Votes	%
Luis Raymund Villafuerte	National Unity Party	111,743	78.66
Ronnie E. Abasola	Lakas–CMD	30,324	21.34
Total		142,067	100.00

=== 3rd District ===
Candidate	Party	Votes	%
Gabriel Bordado	Liberal Party	140,357	58.00
Noel N. de Luna	Pederalismo ng Dugong Dakilang Samahan	51,377	21.23
Sulpicio S. Roco Jr	Lakas–CMD	29,184	12.06
Jose Anselmo I. Cadiz	Aksyon Demokratiko	10,780	4.45
Juan Agapito M. Tria II	Independent	10,297	4.26
Total		241,995	100.00

=== 4th District ===
Candidate	Party	Votes	%
Arnulf Bryan Fuentebella	Nationalist People's Coalition	132,310	58.60
Antonio B. Chavez	PDP–Laban	93,457	41.40
Total		225,767	100.00

=== 5th District ===
Candidate	Party	Votes	%
Miguel Luis Villafuerte	PDP–Laban	153,852	60.15
Madelaine Y. Alfelor	Nationalist People's Coalition	101,944	39.85
Total		255,796	100.00

== Camiguin ==
Candidate	Party	Votes	%
Jurdin Jesus Romualdo	PDP–Laban	33,079	61.78
Homer A. Mabale	Independent	16,757	31.30
Adriano A. Ebcas	Independent	3,703	6.92
Total		53,539	100.00

== Capiz ==
=== 1st District ===
Candidate	Party	Votes	%
Emmanuel A. Billones Sr	Liberal Party	110,349	53.01
Esteban Evan E. Contreras I	PDP–Laban	54,558	26.21
Edgar D. Agana	People's Reform Party	42,726	20.53
Ambrosio D. Diapo	Partido Pederal ng Maharlika	518	0.25
Total		208,151	100.00

=== 2nd District ===
Candidate	Party	Votes	%
Jane Castro	Lakas–CMD	110,609	58.26
Leodegario A. Labao Jr	PDP–Laban	73,243	38.58
Eleuper M. Martinez	PROMDI	3,861	2.03
Maria Vilma V. Besana	Partido Federal ng Pilipinas	1,141	0.60
Ronilo L. Esteves	Pederalismo ng Dugong Dakilang Samahan	985	0.52
Total		189,839	100.00

== Catanduanes ==
Candidate	Party	Votes	%
Eulogio R. Rodriguez	Independent	75,432	47.10
Hector S. Sanchez	Lakas–CMD	48,684	30.40
Cesar V. Sarmiento	National Unity Party	33,281	20.78
Oliver T. Rodulfo	Liberal Party	2,754	1.72
Total		160,151	100.00

== Cavite ==
=== 1st District ===
Candidate	Party	Votes	%
Ramon Jolo H. Bautista Revilla III	Lakas–CMD	102,259	52.31
Paul Plaridel A. Abaya Jr	Liberal Party	93,234	47.69
Total		195,493	100.00

=== 2nd District ===
Candidate	Party	Votes	%
Jesusa Victoria G. Hernandez-Bautista Revilla	Lakas–CMD	168,385	86.05
Jose Herminio F. Japson	Independent	18,142	9.27
George Abraham F. Ber Ado	Independent	9,158	4.68
Total		195,685	100.00

=== 3rd District ===
Candidate	Party	Votes	%
Adrian Jay Advincula	National Unity Party	154,292	100.00
Total		154,292	100.00

=== 4th District ===
Candidate	Party	Votes	%
Elpidio Barzaga Jr.	National Unity Party	278,386	89.86
Osmundo M. Calupad	Independent	31,421	10.14
Total		309,807	100.00

=== 5th District ===
Candidate	Party	Votes	%
Roy Loyola	Nationalist People's Coalition	201,418	91.57
Rhenan A. de Castro	Partido Federal ng Pilipinas	18,540	8.43
Total		219,958	100.00

=== 6th District ===
Candidate	Party	Votes	%
Antonio Ferrer	National Unity Party	118,371	100.00
Total		118,371	100.00

=== 7th District ===
Candidate	Party	Votes	%
Jesus Crispin Remulla	National Unity Party	202,784	100.00
Total		202,784	100.00

=== 8th District ===
Candidate	Party	Votes	%
Aniela Bianca D. Tolentino	National Unity Party	166,077	89.74
Allan R. Par	Independent	18,995	10.26
Total		185,072	100.00

== Cebu ==
=== 1st District ===
Candidate	Party	Votes	%
Rhea Gullas	Nacionalista Party	288,131	100.00
Total		288,131	100.00

=== 2nd District ===
Candidate	Party	Votes	%
Edsel Galeos	PDP–Laban	73,122	51.73
Jose Mari D. Salvador	National Unity Party	66,999	47.40
Leony E. Gegremosa	Partido Federal ng Pilipinas	1,236	0.87
Total		141,357	100.00

=== 3rd District ===
Candidate	Party	Votes	%
Pablo John Garcia	National Unity Party/One Cebu	201,530	100.00
Total		201,530	100.00

=== 4th District ===
Candidate	Party	Votes	%
Janice Salimbangon	National Unity Party	163,913	61.13
Celestino A. Martinez III	Partido Pilipino sa Pagbabago	102,020	38.05
Salvador B. Cariaga	Independent	2,223	0.83
Total		268,156	100.00

=== 5th District ===
Candidate	Party	Votes	%
Vincent Franco D. Frasco	National Unity Party/One Cebu	222,288	67.18
Ramon Durano VI	Partido Pilipino sa Pagbabago	108,596	32.82
Total		330,884	100.00

=== 6th District ===
Candidate	Party	Votes	%
Daphne Lagon	Lakas–CMD	82,443	74.80
Martin Adelino Maxarl Niño S. Sitoy	Partido Pilipino sa Pagbabago	21,210	19.24
Guillermo A. Sitoy	Independent	5,493	4.98
Ruben L. Talaboc	PROMDI	643	0.58
Jaydar A. Medrozo	Independent	425	0.39
Total		110,214	100.00

=== 7th District ===
Candidate	Party	Votes	%
Peter John Calderon	Nationalist People's Coalition	94,715	100.00
Total		94,715	100.00

== Cebu City ==
=== 1st District ===
Candidate	Party	Votes	%
Rachel del Mar	Nationalist People's Coalition	117,512	45.99
Prisca Niña O. Mabatid	PDP–Laban	64,447	25.22
Richard Edison U. Yap	National Unity Party	52,982	20.74
Avenescio A. Piramide	Lakas–CMD	18,627	7.29
Manuel M. Momongan	Independent	1,929	0.75
Total		255,497	100.00

=== 2nd District ===
Candidate	Party	Votes	%
Eduardo Rama Jr.	PDP–Laban	168,476	54.43
BG Rodrigo Abellanosa Jr.	Laban ng Demokratikong Pilipino	141,076	45.57
Total		309,552	100.00

== Cotabato ==
=== 1st District ===
Candidate	Party	Votes	%
Joselito S. Sacdalan	PDP–Laban	150,275	89.63
Arturo C. dela Peña	PROMDI	10,383	6.19
Abdulbassit H. Dilangalen	Independent	6,996	4.17
Total		167,654	100.00

=== 2nd District ===
Candidate	Party	Votes	%
Rudy Caoagdan	Nacionalista Party	170,262	96.40
Kier G. Labog	Independent	6,350	3.60
Total		176,612	100.00

=== 3rd District ===
Candidate	Party	Votes	%
Ma. Alana Samantha T. Santos	Lakas–CMD	119,079	58.38
Nelda O. Tejada	PDP–Laban	69,697	34.17
Rene A. Roldan	Independent	15,185	7.45
Total		203,961	100.00

== Davao City ==
=== 1st District ===
Candidate	Party	Votes	%
Paolo Duterte	Hugpong ng Pagbabago	224,008	92.94
Ma. Victoria Z. Maglana	Independent	14,914	6.19
Jamal R. Kanan	Independent	1,432	0.59
Jovanie C. Mantawel	Independent	683	0.28
Total		241,037	100.00

=== 2nd District ===
Candidate	Party	Votes	%
Vincent Garcia	Hugpong ng Pagbabago	159,702	67.70
Danilo C. Dayanghirang	Hugpong sa Tawong Lungsod	73,796	31.28
Alberto D. Dulong	Independent	2,415	1.02
Total		235,913	100.00

=== 3rd District ===
Candidate	Party	Votes	%
Isidro Ungab	Hugpong ng Pagbabago	180,286	97.81
Abundio M. Indonilla	Independent	4,043	2.19
Total		184,329	100.00

== Davao de Oro ==
=== 1st District ===
Candidate	Party	Votes	%
Ma. Carmen S. Zamora-Apsay	Hugpong ng Pagbabago	104,779	54.14
Joanna Aileen A. Gentugaya	PDP–Laban	82,898	42.83
Nena G. Atamosa	Independent	5,863	3.03
Total		193,540	100.00

=== 2nd District ===
Candidate	Party	Votes	%
Ruwel Peter Gonzaga	PDP–Laban	136,379	60.41
Jose R. Caballero	Hugpong ng Pagbabago	89,388	39.59
Total		225,767	100.00

== Davao del Norte ==
=== 1st District ===
Candidate	Party	Votes	%
Pantaleon Alvarez	Partido para sa Demokratikong Reporma	143,057	56.69
Tristan Royce R. Aala	Hugpong ng Pagbabago	107,156	42.46
Ronelo M. Rafales	Independent	2,133	0.85
Total		252,346	100.00

=== 2nd District ===
Candidate	Party	Votes	%
Alan Dujali	Hugpong ng Pagbabago	166,750	62.99
Janris Jay G. Relampagos	Partido para sa Demokratikong Reporma	97,987	37.01
Total		264,737	100.00

== Davao del Sur ==
Candidate	Party	Votes	%
John Tracy Cagas	Nacionalista Party	214,741	67.70
Erwin S. Llanos	Hugpong ng Pagbabago	85,109	26.83
Wilhelmina B. King-Almendras	Independent	13,927	4.39
Brando L. Agbon	Independent	3,406	1.07
Total		317,183	100.00

== Davao Occidental ==
Candidate	Party	Votes	%
Claude Bautista	Hugpong ng Pagbabago	106,637	100.00
Total		106,637	100.00

== Davao Oriental ==
=== 1st District ===
Candidate	Party	Votes	%
Nelson Dayanghirang Sr.	Nacionalista Party	95,035	100.00
Total		95,035	100.00

=== 2nd District ===
Candidate	Party	Votes	%
Cheeno Miguel D. Almario	PDP–Laban	110,892	58.43
Louis Philippe N. Rabat	Nacionalista Party	78,905	41.57
Total		189,797	100.00

== Dinagat Islands ==
Candidate	Party	Votes	%
Alan Uno Ecleo	Lakas–CMD	37,458	64.72
Geraldine B. Ecleo	Liberal Party	20,415	35.28
Total		57,873	100.00

== Eastern Samar ==
Candidate	Party	Votes	%
Maria Fe Abunda	PDP–Laban	220,111	94.59
Febida L. Padel	Independent	12,593	5.41
Total		232,704	100.00

== General Santos ==
Candidate	Party	Votes	%
Loreto B. Acharon	Nationalist People's Coalition	114,532	46.68
Ronnel C. Rivera	Nacionalista Party	82,382	33.57
Jacinto R. Omila Jr	Achievers with Integrity Movement	48,462	19.75
Total		245,376	100.00

== Guimaras ==
Candidate	Party	Votes	%
Ma. Lucille L. Nava	PDP–Laban	93,994	97.22
Diosdado F. Veloso	Kilusang Bagong Lipunan	2,684	2.78
Total		96,678	100.00

== Ifugao ==
Candidate	Party	Votes	%
Solomon Chungalao	Nationalist People's Coalition	48,231	43.94
Mariano B. Buyagawan Jr.	People's Reform Party	34,004	30.98
Eugene M. Balitang	Laban ng Demokratikong Pilipino	27,227	24.80
Nelson B. Ayoc	Independent	310	0.28
Total		109,772	100.00

== Iligan ==
Candidate	Party	Votes	%
Celso Regencia	PDP–Laban	75,426	51.77
Vicente F. Belmonte Jr	National Unity Party	70,272	48.23
Total		145,698	100.00

== Ilocos Norte ==
=== 1st District ===
Candidate	Party	Votes	%
Ferdinand Alexander A. Marcos III	Nacionalista Party	108,423	56.63
Ria Christina Fariñas	PDP–Laban	83,034	43.37
Total		191,457	100.00

=== 2nd District ===
Candidate	Party	Votes	%
Eugenio Angelo M. Barba	Nacionalista Party	127,867	79.08
Jeffrey Jubal C. Nalupta	Partido para sa Demokratikong Reporma	30,920	19.12
Juanito F. Antonio	PDP–Laban	2,897	1.79
Total		161,684	100.00

== Ilocos Sur ==
=== 1st District ===
Candidate	Party	Votes	%
Ronald Singson	Nationalist People's Coalition	99,376	57.48
Deogracias Victor Savellano	Nacionalista Party	73,503	42.52
Total		172,879	100.00

=== 2nd District ===
Candidate	Party	Votes	%
Grace Kristine G. Singson-Meehan	Nationalist People's Coalition	180,953	100.00
Total		180,953	100.00

== Iloilo ==
=== 1st District ===
Candidate	Party	Votes	%
Janette Garin	National Unity Party	148,558	83.48
Victor T. Tabaquirao	PDP–Laban	29,388	16.52
Total		177,946	100.00

=== 2nd District ===
Candidate	Party	Votes	%
Michael Gorriceta	Nacionalista Party	155,133	100.00
Total		155,133	100.00

=== 3rd District ===
Candidate	Party	Votes	%
Lorenz Defensor	National Unity Party	197,231	98.28
Eduardo P. Artazona	Independent	3,459	1.72
Total		200,690	100.00

=== 4th District ===
Candidate	Party	Votes	%
Ferjenel Biron	Nacionalista Party	145,714	77.42
Antonio B. Parcon	Independent	31,942	16.97
Reynaldo M. Galeno	Partido Federal ng Pilipinas	10,563	5.61
Total		188,219	100.00

=== 5th District ===
Candidate	Party	Votes	%
Raul Tupas	Nacionalista Party	173,031	69.68
Niel Tupas Jr.	Liberal Party	75,304	30.32
Total		248,335	100.00

== Iloilo City ==
Candidate	Party	Votes	%
Julienne Baronda	National Unity Party	147,834	62.88
Jose Espinosa III	Nacionalista Party	84,168	35.80
Pascual R. Espinosa Jr	Independent	1,666	0.71
Rudy B. Bantolo	Independent	1,445	0.61
Total		235,113	100.00

== Isabela ==
=== 1st District ===
Candidate	Party	Votes	%
Antonio T. Albano	Lakas–CMD	176,265	97.60
Stephen G. Soliven	Independent	4,337	2.40
Total		180,602	100.00

=== 2nd District ===
Candidate	Party	Votes	%
Ed Christopher Go	Nacionalista Party	80,841	85.35
Jeryll Harold P. Respicio	Independent	12,711	13.42
Faustino L. Reyes	Kilusang Bagong Lipunan	588	0.62
Elizabeth R. Magora	Philippine Green Republican Party	581	0.61
Total		94,721	100.00

=== 3rd District ===
Candidate	Party	Votes	%
Ian Paul Dy	Nationalist People's Coalition	113,838	100.00
Total		113,838	100.00

=== 4th District ===
Candidate	Party	Votes	%
Joseph Tan	PDP–Laban	106,651	74.90
Jeanybel A. Coquilla	Pederalismo ng Dugong Dakilang Samahan	30,392	21.34
Lucas R. Florentino	Nationalist People's Coalition	2,855	2.01
Ramon M. Espiritu	Partido para sa Demokratikong Reporma	1,421	1.00
Ellenday C. Gabriel	Independent	1,070	0.75
Total		142,389	100.00

=== 5th District ===
Candidate	Party	Votes	%
Faustino Michael Carlos T. Dy III	Nationalist People's Coalition	82,062	66.47
Kristin Bernadette L. Uy	PDP–Laban	39,038	31.62
Gilbert I. San Pedro	PDP–Laban	2,353	1.91
Total		123,453	100.00

=== 6th District ===
Candidate	Party	Votes	%
Faustino A. Dy V	PDP–Laban	121,381	90.83
Armando C. Velasco	PROMDI	12,255	9.17
Total		133,636	100.00

== Kalinga ==
Candidate	Party	Votes	%
Allen Jesse C. Mangaoang	Nacionalista Party	94,430	76.05
Roy A. Dickpus	Independent	29,744	23.95
Total		124,174	100.00

== La Union ==
=== 1st District ===
Candidate	Party	Votes	%
Francisco Paolo P. Ortega V	Nationalist People's Coalition	144,295	76.80
Miguel Corleone B. Magsaysay	Labor Party Philippines	36,330	19.34
Mario G. Rodriguez	Independent	7,247	3.86
Total		187,872	100.00

=== 2nd District ===
Candidate	Party	Votes	%
Dante Garcia	People's Reform Party	134,938	54.14
Sandra Eriguel	Lakas–CMD	114,314	45.86
Total		249,252	100.00

== Laguna ==
=== 1st District ===
Candidate	Party	Votes	%
Ma. Rene Ann Lourdes G. Matibag	PDP–Laban	69,815	50.68
Dave M. Almarinez	Nacionalista Party	53,783	39.04
Ronald B. Aldave	People's Reform Party	5,346	3.88
Kathleen Kay T. Gilbuena	Liberal Party	4,028	2.92
Edsel A. Mercado Jr	Independent	3,889	2.82
John A. Gilbuena	Independent	895	0.65
Total		137,756	100.00

=== 2nd District ===
Candidate	Party	Votes	%
Ruth Mariano-Hernandez	PDP–Laban	168,368	64.03
Efraim Genuino	Bigkis Pinoy Movement	94,571	35.97
Total		262,939	100.00

=== 3rd District ===
Candidate	Party	Votes	%
Loreto Amante	PDP–Laban	197,234	72.75
Angelica B. Jones Alarva	PROMDI	68,044	25.10
Ma. Cristina T. Villamor	Aksyon Demokratiko	3,778	1.39
King G. Mediano	Independent	2,053	0.76
Total		271,109	100.00

=== 4th District ===
Candidate	Party	Votes	%
Ma. Jamina Katherine B. Agarao-Oloroso	PDP–Laban	153,753	50.04
Antonio M. Carolino	Aksyon Demokratiko	153,477	49.96
Total		307,230	100.00

== Lanao del Norte ==
=== 1st District ===
Candidate	Party	Votes	%
Mohamad Khalid Dimaporo	PDP–Laban	108,498	87.87
Osop Joe P. Abbas	Partido Federal ng Pilipinas	14,977	12.13
Total		123,475	100.00

=== 2nd District ===
Candidate	Party	Votes	%
Sittie Aminah Q. Dimaporo	Lakas–CMD	138,910	91.14
Jose A. Patalinghug Jr.	Partido Federal ng Pilipinas	13,501	8.86
Total		152,411	100.00

== Lanao del Sur ==
=== 1st District ===
Candidate	Party	Votes	%
Ziaur-Rahman A. Adiong	Lakas–CMD	223,631	83.83
Fatani S. Abdul Malik	Ummah Party	29,043	10.89
Ansaroden Magangcong Sani B. Lucman Moner	Independent	5,833	2.19
Subair G. Mustapha	Reform	5,387	2.02
Mohammad I. Razuman	Independent	2,870	1.08
Total		266,764	100.00

=== 2nd District ===
Candidate	Party	Votes	%
Yasser Balindong	Lakas–CMD	111,704	56.19
Farouk A. Macarambon Jr	Aksyon Demokratiko	83,954	42.23
Sagusara P. Andong	Independent	2,494	1.25
Abolkhair P. Maca-ayan	Reform	660	0.33
Total		198,812	100.00

== Lapu-Lapu City ==
Candidate	Party	Votes	%
Ma. Cynthia King-Chan	PDP–Laban	147,631	74.17
Michael M. Dignos	Lakas–CMD	38,844	19.52
Manuel T. Degollacion Jr.	Pederalismo ng Dugong Dakilang Samahan	6,929	3.48
Chezie K. Demegillo	Liberal Party	3,283	1.65
Genaro B. Tampus	Independent	1,562	0.78
Pablo Q. Doronio Jr	PLM	796	0.40
Total		199,045	100.00

== Las Piñas ==
Candidate	Party	Votes	%
Camille A. Villar-Genuino	Nacionalista Party	130,812	60.90
Luisito D. Redoble	Ang Kapatiran	65,751	30.61
Felipe T. Garduque II	Independent	18,249	8.50
Total		214,812	100.00

== Leyte ==
=== 1st District ===
Candidate	Party	Votes	%
Ferdinand Martin G. Romualdez	Lakas–CMD	181,415	100.00
Total		181,415	100.00

=== 2nd District ===
Candidate	Party	Votes	%
Lolita Javier	Nacionalista Party	151,617	71.05
Henry C. Ong	PDP–Laban	54,343	25.46
Alberto N. Hidalgo	Independent	5,215	2.44
Ronald Dominic B. Babante	Partido Federal ng Pilipinas	2,229	1.04
Total		213,404	100.00

=== 3rd District ===
Candidate	Party	Votes	%
Anna Victoria Veloso-Tuazon	National Unity Party	53,457	100.00
Total		53,457	100.00

=== 4th District ===
Candidate	Party	Votes	%
Richard Frank I. Gomez	PDP–Laban	148,941	55.81
Gregorio Y. Larrazabal	Independent	117,912	44.19
Total		266,853	100.00

=== 5th District ===
Candidate	Party	Votes	%
Carl Nicolas C. Cari	PDP–Laban	172,023	100.00
Total		172,023	100.00

== Maguindanao ==
=== 1st District ===
Candidate	Party	Votes	%
Sittie Shahara "Dimple" I. Mastura	PDP–Laban	157,732	54.55
Datu Roonie Q. Sinsuat Sr.	United Bangsamoro Justice Party	106,470	36.82
Bai Pangandongan G. Dilangalen	Kilusang Bagong Lipunan	10,811	3.74
Mohammad Ali S. Amil	Independent	7,835	2.71
Jashiraya S. Dilangalen	Partido Demokratiko Sosyalista ng Pilipinas	4,564	1.58
Mastura A. Mokamad	PROMDI	1,100	0.38
Ellas M. Dimarao	Independent	628	0.22
Total		289,140	100.00

=== 2nd District ===
Candidate	Party	Votes	%
Mohamad P. Paglas Sr	Nacionalista Party	169,017	57.80
Zajid G. Mangudadatu	United Bangsamoro Justice Party	121,085	41.41
Jasmin P. Mangacop	PROMDI	1,411	0.48
Kadil A. Kayadtugan	Independent	925	0.32
Total		292,438	100.00

== Makati ==
=== 1st District ===
Candidate	Party	Votes	%
Romulo Peña Jr.	Liberal Party	146,131	94.87
Minnie A. Antonio	Independent	4,801	3.12
Ferdinand T. Sevilla	Independent	3,104	2.02
Total		154,036	100.00

=== 2nd District ===
Candidate	Party	Votes	%
Luis Jose Angel N. Campos Jr	Nationalist People's Coalition	164,948	91.75
Ricardo L. Opoc	Independent	14,838	8.25
Total		179,786	100.00

== Malabon ==
Candidate	Party	Votes	%
Josephine Veronique R. Lacson-Noel	Nationalist People's Coalition	102,320	56.09
Federico S. Sandoval II	PDP–Laban	80,089	43.91
Total		182,409	100.00

== Mandaluyong ==
Candidate	Party	Votes	%
Neptali Gonzales II	National Unity Party	132,558	78.18
Roehl B. Bacar	Aksyon Demokratiko	36,998	21.82
Total		169,556	100.00

== Mandaue ==
Candidate	Party	Votes	%
Emmarie Ouano-Dizon	PDP–Laban	153,004	100.00
Total		153,004	100.00

== Manila ==
=== 1st District ===
Candidate	Party	Votes	%
Ernesto M. Dionisio Jr	Aksyon Demokratiko/Asenso Manileño	88,327	44.66
Manuel Luis T. Lopez	PDP–Laban	74,991	37.92
Benjamin R. Asilo	Liberal Party	34,441	17.42
Total		197,759	100.00

=== 2nd District ===
Candidate	Party	Votes	%
Rolando M. Valeriano	National Unity Party/Asenso Manileño	70,146	62.11
Carlo Vincent V. Lopez	Nacionalista Party	42,787	37.89
Total		112,933	100.00

=== 3rd District ===
Candidate	Party	Votes	%
Joel Chua	Aksyon Demokratiko/Asenso Manileño	68,946	67.78
Ramon D. Morales	PDP–Laban	31,030	30.50
Clark Field C. Arroño III	Independent	1,748	1.72
Total		101,724	100.00

=== 4th District ===
Candidate	Party	Votes	%
Edward Maceda	Nationalist People's Coalition/Asenso Manileño	90,075	73.40
Maria Theresa B. Bonoan-David	Independent	25,961	21.15
Christopher S. Gabriel	People's Reform Party	6,687	5.45
Total		122,723	100.00

=== 5th District ===
Candidate	Party	Votes	%
William Irwin C. Tieng	Aksyon Demokratiko/Asenso Manileño	83,286	50.99
Amanda Christina L. Bagatsing	National Unity Party	80,045	49.01
Total		163,331	100.00

=== 6th District ===
Candidate	Party	Votes	%
Bienvenido M. Abante Jr	National Unity Party/Asenso Manileño	95,431	79.37
Romualdo M. Billanes	People's Reform Party	22,221	18.48
Antonio S. Sityar II	Independent	2,582	2.15
Total		120,234	100.00

== Marikina ==
=== 1st District ===
Candidate	Party	Votes	%
Marjorie Ann Teodoro	United Nationalist Alliance	68,572	73.61
Jose Miguel Cadiz	Nationalist People's Coalition	24,584	26.39
Total		93,156	100.00

=== 2nd District ===
Candidate	Party	Votes	%
Stella Luz F. Alabastro-Quimbo	Liberal Party	103,108	82.70
Del de Guzman	Aksyon Demokratiko	20,674	16.58
Mauro R. Arce	Kilusang Bagong Lipunan	894	0.72
Total		124,676	100.00

== Marinduque ==
Candidate	Party	Votes	%
Lord Allan Velasco	PDP–Laban	100,794	100.00
Total		100,794	100.00

== Masbate ==
=== 1st District ===
Candidate	Party	Votes	%
Richard Kho	PDP–Laban	57,770	59.34
Ma. Vida Espinosa-Bravo	National Unity Party	39,591	40.66
Total		97,361	100.00

=== 2nd District ===
Candidate	Party	Votes	%
Olga T. Kho	PDP–Laban	123,160	73.68
Scott Davies S. Lanete	National Unity Party	44,000	26.32
Total		167,160	100.00

=== 3rd District ===
Candidate	Party	Votes	%
Wilton Kho	PDP–Laban	94,373	63.55
Rizalina Seachon-Lanete	Nationalist People's Coalition	54,121	36.45
Total		148,494	100.00

== Misamis Occidental ==
=== 1st District ===
Candidate	Party	Votes	%
Jason P. Almonte	PDP–Laban	93,732	58.33
Diego C. Ty	National Unity Party	66,241	41.22
Reynold P. Yap	Partido Federal ng Pilipinas	710	0.44
Total		160,683	100.00
Source: "2022 NLE". COMELEC.

=== 2nd District ===
Candidate	Party	Votes	%
Sancho Fernando F. Oaminal	Nacionalista Party	143,250	76.11
Jennifer W. Tan	Laban ng Demokratikong Pilipino	44,077	23.42
Lorelei Rhona C. Jimenez	Partido Federal ng Pilipinas	879	0.47
Total		188,206	100.00
Source: "2022 NLE". COMELEC.

== Misamis Oriental ==
=== 1st District ===
Candidate	Party	Votes	%
Christian S. Unabia	Lakas–CMD	114,936	51.04
Jennifer A. Lagbas	National Unity Party	105,875	47.02
Jerry V. Khu	Katipunan ng Nagkakaisang Pilipino	4,370	1.94
Total		225,181	100.00

=== 2nd District ===
Candidate	Party	Votes	%
Yevgeny Vicente B. Emano	Padayon Pilipino	166,374	56.31
Julio T. Uy	National Unity Party	127,292	43.08
Mylene E. Mehila	Independent	1,794	0.61
Total		295,460	100.00

== Mountain Province ==
Candidate	Party	Votes	%
Maximo Dalog Jr.	Nacionalista Party	52,927	56.09
Jupiter C. Dominguez	Lakas–CMD	41,437	43.91
Total		94,364	100.00

== Muntinlupa ==
Candidate	Party	Votes	%
Jaime Fresnedi	Liberal Party	183,085	77.71
Silverio R. Garing	PDP–Laban	52,530	22.29
Total		235,615	100.00

== Navotas ==
Candidate	Party	Votes	%
Tobias Reynald M. Tiangco	Partido Navoteño	79,505	62.85
Lutgardo V. Cruz	Aksyon Demokratiko	46,991	37.15
Total		126,496	100.00

== Negros Occidental ==
=== 1st District ===
Candidate	Party	Votes	%
Gerardo P. Valmayor Jr.	Nationalist People's Coalition	123,050	100.00
Total		123,050	100.00

=== 2nd District ===
Candidate	Party	Votes	%
Alfredo Marañon III	National Unity Party/United Negros Alliance	113,988	100.00
Total		113,988	100.00

=== 3rd District ===
Candidate	Party	Votes	%
Jose Francisco Benitez	PDP–Laban	204,301	92.33
Bernard Q. Ferraris	Reform	16,967	7.67
Total		221,268	100.00

=== 4th District ===
Candidate	Party	Votes	%
Juliet Marie B. de Leon-Ferrer	National Unity Party/United Negros Alliance	140,367	100.00
Total		140,367	100.00

=== 5th District ===
Candidate	Party	Votes	%
Emilio Bernardino L. Yulo III	Independent	118,558	54.39
Ma. Lourdes T. Arroyo-Lesaca	Lakas–CMD/United Negros Alliance	76,115	34.92
Anthony V. Javelosa	Independent	23,288	10.68
Total		217,961	100.00

=== 6th District ===
Candidate	Party	Votes	%
Mercedes K. Alvarez-Lansang	Nationalist People's Coalition	165,848	100.00
Total		165,848	100.00

== Negros Oriental ==
=== 1st District ===
Candidate	Party	Votes	%
Jocelyn Sy-Limkaichong	Liberal Party	143,849	100.00
Total		143,849	100.00
Source: "2022 NLE". COMELEC.

=== 2nd District ===
Candidate	Party	Votes	%
Manuel T. Sagarbarria Sr.	Nationalist People's Coalition	160,262	60.68
George P. Arnaiz	Lakas–CMD	103,848	39.32
Total		264,110	100.00
Source: "2022 NLE". COMELEC.

=== 3rd District ===
Candidate	Party	Votes	%
Arnolfo Teves Jr.	Nationalist People's Coalition	91,482	48.99
Reynaldo P. Lopez	Nacionalista Party	87,684	46.96
Joan B. Estrella	PROMDI	4,779	2.56
Jocelyn C. Estrella	Independent	2,779	1.49
Total		186,724	100.00
Source: "2022 NLE". COMELEC.

== Northern Samar ==
=== 1st District ===
Candidate	Party	Votes	%
Paul Daza	National Unity Party	107,510	58.75
Teodoro M. Jumamil	People's Reform Party	51,804	28.31
Pascasio Joshua Maria H. Vicario III	PDP–Laban	21,348	11.67
Esteban E. Sosing	Independent	1,166	0.64
Essie S. Unay	Independent	1,164	0.64
Total		182,992	100.00

=== 2nd District ===
Candidate	Party	Votes	%
Harris Christopher M. Ongchuan	National Unity Party	93,488	85.63
Francis George P. Lucero	Independent	11,565	10.59
Leticia M. Siervo	PROMDI	4,118	3.77
Total		109,171	100.00

== Nueva Ecija ==
=== 1st District ===
Candidate	Party	Votes	%
Mikaela Angela B. Suansing-Interior	Nacionalista Party	171,946	58.77
Rommel Padilla	PDP–Laban	78,251	26.75
Alexander F. Balutan	Reform	42,354	14.48
Total		292,551	100.00

=== 2nd District ===
Candidate	Party	Votes	%
Joseph Gilbert Violago	National Unity Party	116,099	47.79
Joselito F. Violago	Independent	65,797	27.08
Simeon E. Garcia Jr.	Aksyon Demokratiko	59,607	24.54
Danilo R. Malanda	Independent	1,436	0.59
Total		242,939	100.00

=== 3rd District ===
Candidate	Party	Votes	%
Rosanna Vergara	PDP–Laban	180,888	53.08
Czarina Umali	Unang Sigaw	159,922	46.92
Total		340,810	100.00

=== 4th District ===
Candidate	Party	Votes	%
Emerson Pascual	PDP–Laban	177,046	53.55
Maricel G. Natividad Nagaño	Unang Sigaw	153,599	46.45
Total		330,645	100.00

== Nueva Vizcaya ==
Candidate	Party	Votes	%
Luisa Lloren Cuaresma	Lakas–CMD	165,360	72.25
Flodemonte S. Gerdan	Nacionalista Party	62,115	27.14
Lawrence S. Santa Ana	Independent	1,388	0.61
Total		228,863	100.00

== Occidental Mindoro ==
Candidate	Party	Votes	%
Leody Tarriela	Pederalismo ng Dugong Dakilang Samahan	92,864	38.64
Mark Philip V. Ramirez	Liberal Party	44,607	18.56
Manuel E. Leycano Jr	Partido para sa Demokratikong Reporma	37,590	15.64
Peter J. Alfaro	PDP–Laban	36,948	15.37
Mariliza Villarosa-Kalaw	Lakas–CMD	16,115	6.71
Josefino M. Melgar Jr	Nationalist People's Coalition	12,191	5.07
Total		240,315	100.00
Source: "2022 NLE". COMELEC.

== Oriental Mindoro ==
=== 1st District ===
Candidate	Party	Votes	%
Arnan Panaligan	Mindoro Bago Sarili	142,095	61.34
Mark N. Marcos	PDP–Laban	87,666	37.85
Alvaro E. Eduardo	Independent	1,879	0.81
Total		231,640	100.00

=== 2nd District ===
Candidate	Party	Votes	%
Alfonso Umali Jr.	Liberal Party	82,761	44.46
Joanna P. Valencia-de Jesus	PDP–Laban	62,194	33.41
Anthony L. Yap	Aksyon Demokratiko	39,761	21.36
Mario S. Florencondia	Independent	1,437	0.77
Total		186,153	100.00

== Palawan ==
=== 1st District ===
Candidate	Party	Votes	%
Edgardo Salvame	People's Reform Party	107,750	47.35
Antonio C. Alvarez	National Unity Party	85,964	37.78
Socorro R. Reyes-Gaw	Partido Federal ng Pilipinas	30,787	13.53
Lourdes P. Benipayo	Kilusang Bagong Lipunan	3,043	1.34
Total		227,544	100.00
Source: "2022 NLE". COMELEC.

=== 2nd District ===
Candidate	Party	Votes	%
Jose Alvarez	PDP–Laban	99,081	51.77
Cyrille F. Abueg-Zaldivar	Liberal Party	62,210	32.50
Stephen E. Cascolan	Kilusang Bagong Lipunan	14,792	7.73
Edwin Gastanes	Independent	13,063	6.83
Enrico B. Mejorada	Independent	1,153	0.60
Magnolia May R. de Leon-San Jose	Independent	1,093	0.57
Total		191,392	100.00
Source: "2022 NLE". COMELEC.

=== 3rd District ===
Candidate	Party	Votes	%
Edward Hagedorn	PDP–Laban	80,325	52.74
Gil Acosta Jr.	Partidong Pagbabago ng Palawan	71,986	47.26
Total		152,311	100.00
Source: "2022 NLE". COMELEC.

== Pampanga ==
=== 1st District ===
Candidate	Party	Votes	%
Carmelo Lazatin II	PDP–Laban	245,672	100.00
Total		245,672	100.00

=== 2nd District ===
Candidate	Party	Votes	%
Gloria Macapagal Arroyo	Lakas–CMD	233,042	100.00
Total		233,042	100.00

=== 3rd District ===
Candidate	Party	Votes	%
Aurelio Gonzales Jr.	PDP–Laban	291,594	100.00
Total		291,594	100.00

=== 4th District ===
Candidate	Party	Votes	%
Anna York Cristina P. Bondoc-Sagum	Nacionalista Party	260,362	96.25
Regino L. Mallari	Independent	10,155	3.75
Total		270,517	100.00

== Pangasinan ==
=== 1st District ===
Candidate	Party	Votes	%
Arthur Celeste	Nacionalista Party	155,372	65.19
Oscar Orbos	Aksyon Demokratiko	82,983	34.81
Total		238,355	100.00

=== 2nd District ===
Candidate	Party	Votes	%
Marcos Juan Bruno O. Cojuangco	Nationalist People's Coalition	152,077	51.73
Jumel Anthony I. Espino	PDP–Laban	137,431	46.75
Roberto A. Merrera Jr.	Partido Pederal ng Maharlika	4,454	1.52
Total		293,962	100.00

=== 3rd District ===
Candidate	Party	Votes	%
Maria Rachel Arenas	PDP–Laban	311,862	90.47
Generoso T. Mamaril	Partido Pilipino sa Pagbabago	26,555	7.70
Teodoro P. Cabral	Partido Pederal ng Maharlika	6,302	1.83
Total		344,719	100.00

=== 4th District ===
Candidate	Party	Votes	%
Christopher George Martin P. de Venecia	Lakas–CMD	213,020	80.03
Alipio Vittorio Ramon D. Fernandez	Independent	53,162	19.97
Total		266,182	100.00

=== 5th District ===
Candidate	Party	Votes	%
Ramon Guico Jr.	Lakas–CMD	166,921	59.40
Clemente B. Arboleda Jr	PDP–Laban	114,079	40.60
Total		281,000	100.00

=== 6th District ===
Candidate	Party	Votes	%
Marlyn Primicias-Agabas	PDP–Laban	233,397	92.70
Teofilo M. Villamar	Kilusang Bagong Lipunan	18,393	7.30
Total		251,790	100.00

== Parañaque ==
=== 1st District ===
Candidate	Party	Votes	%
Edwin Olivarez	PDP–Laban	91,241	90.16
Jayson C. Moral	Aksyon Demokratiko	5,662	5.60
Pedro C. Montaño	Independent	4,292	4.24
Total		101,195	100.00

=== 2nd District ===
Candidate	Party	Votes	%
Gustavo Alonzo S. Tambunting	National Unity Party	82,357	52.89
Josef C. Maganduga	Samahang Kaagapay ng Agilang Pilipino	73,346	47.11
Total		155,703	100.00

== Pasay ==
Candidate	Party	Votes	%
Antonino Calixto	PDP–Laban	154,422	78.09
Efren L. Alas	Reform	19,106	9.66
Ramon Gilberto P. Yabut II	Independent	14,926	7.55
Jocelyn M. Sato	Partido para sa Demokratikong Reporma	9,285	4.70
Total		197,739	100.00

== Pasig ==
Candidate	Party	Votes	%
Roman Romulo	Independent	304,157	83.89
Richard C. Eusebio	Nacionalista Party	54,431	15.01
Rex B. Maliuanag	Independent	3,977	1.10
Total		362,565	100.00

== Quezon ==
=== 1st District ===
Candidate	Party	Votes	%
Wilfrido Mark M. Enverga Jr	Nationalist People's Coalition	227,368	86.18
Teresita O. Dator	Kilusang Bagong Lipunan	32,841	12.45
Francisco P. Rubio	Independent	2,614	0.99
Lamberto A. Cubilo	Independent	996	0.38
Total		263,819	100.00
Source: "2022 NLE". COMELEC.

=== 2nd District ===
Candidate	Party	Votes	%
David C. Suarez	Nacionalista Party	207,836	52.93
Proceso Alcala	Nationalist People's Coalition	173,639	44.22
Antonio A. Punzalan	Partido para sa Demokratikong Reporma	6,038	1.54
Abigail Jashael V. Bagabaldo	Independent	3,129	0.80
Nebuchadnezzar S. Alejandro	Independent	2,026	0.52
Total		392,668	100.00
Source: "2022 NLE". COMELEC.

=== 3rd District ===
Candidate	Party	Votes	%
Reynante Arrogancia	Partido para sa Demokratikong Reporma	122,379	58.47
Aleta R. Catarina-Suarez	Lakas–CMD	76,174	36.39
Ruel A. Arogante	Labor Party Philippines	7,794	3.72
Analyn M. Suarez	People's Reform Party	2,966	1.42
Total		209,313	100.00
Source: "2022 NLE". COMELEC.

=== 4th District ===
Candidate	Party	Votes	%
Keith Micah Tan	Nationalist People's Coalition	166,591	72.89
Rhodora B. Tan	Lakas–CMD	43,862	19.19
Fernando L. Martinez	National Unity Party	12,193	5.34
Rhodora T. Legaspi	Labor Party Philippines	2,705	1.18
Florencio E. Tierra Jr	Independent	2,191	0.96
Resty C. Martinez	People's Reform Party	1,003	0.44
Total		228,545	100.00
Source: "2022 NLE". COMELEC.

== Quezon City ==
=== 1st District ===
Candidate	Party	Votes	%
Juan Carlos C. Atayde	Independent	112,457	66.85
Anthony Peter D. Crisologo	Lakas–CMD	52,910	31.45
Marcus Aurelius A. Dee	Independent	2,857	1.70
Total		168,224	100.00

=== 2nd District ===
Candidate	Party	Votes	%
Ralph Wendel P. Tulfo	Independent	127,238	53.81
Mari Grace Preciosa H. Castelo	Lakas–CMD	96,565	40.84
Virgilio R. Garcia	Independent	6,231	2.63
Diosdado V. Calonge	Independent	3,533	1.49
Henric D. David	Independent	1,806	0.76
Raul S. Gador	Independent	1,103	0.47
Total		236,476	100.00

=== 3rd District ===
Candidate	Party	Votes	%
Franz Pumaren	National Unity Party	64,177	50.68
Allan Benedict S. Reyes	Nationalist People's Coalition	60,038	47.41
Jessie C. Dignadice	Independent	2,419	1.91
Total		126,634	100.00

=== 4th District ===
Candidate	Party	Votes	%
Marvin Rillo	Lakas–CMD	83,517	50.59
Jesus Manuel C. Suntay	PDP–Laban	81,569	49.41
Total		165,086	100.00

=== 5th District ===
Candidate	Party	Votes	%
Patrick Michael Vargas	PDP–Laban	104,869	50.69
Rose Nono-Lin	Lakas–CMD	73,508	35.53
Mary Ann L. Susano	Partido Federal ng Pilipinas	14,760	7.13
Catherine M. Esplana	Independent	8,557	4.14
Antonio T. Ortega	Independent	2,803	1.35
Rose Lynn V. Sanchez	Independent	1,901	0.92
Angel M. Rustia Jr	Independent	474	0.23
Total		206,872	100.00

=== 6th District ===
Candidate	Party	Votes	%
Marivic Co-Pilar	National Unity Party	99,544	60.01
Vincent Crisologo	Lakas–CMD	55,919	33.71
Tricia Nicole Q. Velasco-Catera	PDP–Laban	10,415	6.28
Total		165,878	100.00

== Quirino ==
Candidate	Party	Votes	%
Midy C. Nacague-Cua	Pederalismo ng Dugong Dakilang Samahan	88,864	94.09
Bick C. Senica	Independent	5,582	5.91
Total		94,446	100.00

== Rizal ==
=== 1st District ===
Candidate	Party	Votes	%
Michael John R. Duavit	Nationalist People's Coalition	308,707	100.00
Total		308,707	100.00
Source: "2022 NLE". COMELEC.

=== 2nd District ===
Candidate	Party	Votes	%
Emigdio P. Tanjuatco III	Liberal Party	166,361	81.08
Mohammad Omar A. Fajardo	PDP–Laban	38,816	18.92
Total		205,177	100.00
Source: "2022 NLE". COMELEC.

=== 3rd District ===
Candidate	Party	Votes	%
Jose Arturo S. Garcia Jr.	Nationalist People's Coalition	48,640	53.33
Cristina C. Diaz	PDP–Laban	36,673	40.21
Maria Cristina B. Diaz	Aksyon Demokratiko	5,894	6.46
Total		91,207	100.00
Source: "2022 NLE". COMELEC.

=== 4th District ===
Candidate	Party	Votes	%
Juan Fidel Felipe F. Nograles	Lakas–CMD	92,176	58.82
Isidro S. Rodriguez Jr.	Nationalist People's Coalition	32,995	21.05
Bonna Lita A. Sanguyo	Partido Federal ng Pilipinas	31,550	20.13
Total		156,721	100.00
Source: "2022 NLE". COMELEC.

== Romblon ==
Candidate	Party	Votes	%
Eleandro Jesus Madrona	Nacionalista Party	128,996	81.18
Joey G. Venancio	Aksyon Demokratiko	29,898	18.82
Total		158,894	100.00

== Samar ==
=== 1st District ===
Candidate	Party	Votes	%
Stephen James Tan	Nacionalista Party	132,436	58.86
Edgar Mary Sarmiento	National Unity Party	92,561	41.14
Total		224,997	100.00

=== 2nd District ===
Candidate	Party	Votes	%
Reynolds Michael Tan	Nacionalista Party	161,825	66.21
Alvin V. Abejuela	National Unity Party	82,590	33.79
Total		244,415	100.00

== San Jose del Monte ==
Candidate	Party	Votes	%
Florida Robes	PDP–Laban	136,680	64.21
Reynaldo S. San Pedro	Partido Pederal ng Maharlika	76,192	35.79
Total		212,872	100.00

== San Juan ==
Candidate	Party	Votes	%
Ysabel Maria J. Zamora-Jornada	PDP–Laban	49,334	64.52
Jannah A. Ejercito	Nationalist People's Coalition	27,133	35.48
Total		76,467	100.00

== Santa Rosa ==
Candidate	Party	Votes	%
Danilo Ramon S. Fernandez	National Unity Party	104,772	64.09
Petronio C. Factoriza	Kilusang Bagong Lipunan	58,704	35.91
Total		163,476	100.00

== Sarangani ==
Candidate	Party	Votes	%
Steve Solon	People's Champ Movement	204,076	92.38
Willie M. Dangane	Partido Pederal ng Maharlika	16,834	7.62
Total		220,910	100.00

== Siquijor ==
Candidate	Party	Votes	%
Zaldy Villa	PDP–Laban/Partido Siquijodnon	33,989	54.08
Orlando A. Fua Jr.	Aksyon Demokratiko	26,722	42.52
Guido A. Ganhinhin	Independent	1,660	2.64
Joy A. Lopes de Andrade	Independent	474	0.75
Total		62,845	100.00

== Sorsogon ==
=== 1st District ===
Candidate	Party	Votes	%
Maria Bernadette G. Escudero	Nationalist People's Coalition	141,922	65.92
Joan Elizabeth M. Lorenzano	National Unity Party	71,217	33.08
Rommel D. Japson	Independent	2,149	1.00
Total		215,288	100.00

=== 2nd District ===
Candidate	Party	Votes	%
Manuel L. Fortes Jr.	Nationalist People's Coalition	102,103	49.66
Robert Ante L. Rodrigueza	National Unity Party	93,996	45.72
Crisostomo G. Gotladera	Lakas–CMD	6,853	3.33
Edgar G. Gino	Pederalismo ng Dugong Dakilang Samahan	2,650	1.29
Total		205,602	100.00

== South Cotabato ==
=== 1st District ===
Candidate	Party	Votes	%
Isidro D. Lumayag	Partido Federal ng Pilipinas	80,501	58.95
Danny B. Nograles	PDP–Laban	56,053	41.05
Total		136,554	100.00

=== 2nd District ===
Candidate	Party	Votes	%
Peter B. Miguel	Partido Federal ng Pilipinas	177,851	53.96
Daisy Avance-Fuentes	Nacionalista Party	130,016	39.44
Benjamin V. Figueroa Jr.	PROMDI	18,300	5.55
Danilo M. Dumandagan	Independent	2,639	0.80
Efren H. Biclar	Independent	817	0.25
Total		329,623	100.00

== Southern Leyte ==
=== 1st District ===
Candidate	Party	Votes	%
Luz Mercado	National Unity Party	74,693	88.09
Vicente A. Geraldo	Independent	10,094	11.91
Total		84,787	100.00

=== 2nd District ===
Candidate	Party	Votes	%
Christopherson Yap	PDP–Laban	63,979	56.74
Florentino S. Fernandez Jr	PROMDI	39,246	34.80
Alexander L. Cuaton	Partido Federal ng Pilipinas	4,340	3.85
Vick M. Barcelon	Independent	3,739	3.32
Ray W. Maupoy	Independent	914	0.81
Miguelino L. Caturan	Independent	546	0.48
Total		112,764	100.00

== Sultan Kudarat ==
=== 1st District ===
Candidate	Party	Votes	%
Bai Rihan M. Sakaluran-Abdurajak	Lakas–CMD	143,596	80.13
Carlos L. Valdez Jr	Aksyon Demokratiko	35,600	19.87
Total		179,196	100.00
Source: "2022 NLE". COMELEC.

=== 2nd District ===
Candidate	Party	Votes	%
Horacio Suansing Jr.	National Unity Party	101,042	59.51
Joseph M. Ortiz	Lakas–CMD	68,759	40.49
Total		169,801	100.00
Source: "2022 NLE". COMELEC.

== Sulu ==
=== 1st District ===
Candidate	Party	Votes	%
Samier Tan	PDP–Laban	186,240	100.00
Total		186,240	100.00

=== 2nd District ===
Candidate	Party	Votes	%
Abdulmunir Arbison Jr.	Lakas–CMD	148,262	100.00
Total		148,262	100.00

== Surigao del Norte ==
=== 1st District ===
Candidate	Party	Votes	%
Francisco Jose Matugas II	PDP–Laban	50,250	60.81
Mary Ann Lucille L. Sering	Nacionalista Party	31,742	38.41
Lanelyn D. Pangilinan	People's Reform Party	642	0.78
Total		82,634	100.00
Source: "2022 NLE". COMELEC.

=== 2nd District ===
Candidate	Party	Votes	%
Robert Ace S. Barbers	Nacionalista Party	162,489	71.56
Fernando T. Larong	PDP–Laban	64,592	28.44
Total		227,081	100.00
Source: "2022 NLE". COMELEC.

== Surigao del Sur ==
=== 1st District ===
Candidate	Party	Votes	%
Romeo Momo	Independent	106,907	50.76
Prospero Pichay Jr.	Lakas–CMD	97,783	46.43
Elizabeth F. Momo	National Unity Party	5,924	2.81
Total		210,614	100.00

=== 2nd District ===
Candidate	Party	Votes	%
Johnny Pimentel	PDP–Laban	110,852	75.93
Edmund R. Estrella	Lakas–CMD	35,136	24.07
Total		145,988	100.00

== Taguig ==
Candidate	Party	Votes	%
Amparo Maria J. Zamora	Nacionalista Party	121,179	68.75
Michelle Anne B. Gonzales	Partido Pilipino sa Pagbabago	55,089	31.25
Total		176,268	100.00

== Taguig–Pateros ==
Candidate	Party	Votes	%
Ricardo S. Cruz Jr	Nacionalista Party	99,059	54.51
Allan M. Cerafica	Partido Pilipino sa Pagbabago	82,673	45.49
Total		181,732	100.00

== Tarlac ==
=== 1st District ===
Candidate	Party	Votes	%
Jaime Eduardo Marc D. Cojuangco	Nationalist People's Coalition	191,827	94.52
Joseph T. Ramac	Independent	11,127	5.48
Total		202,954	100.00
Source: "2022 NLE". COMELEC.

=== 2nd District ===
Candidate	Party	Votes	%
Christian Tell A. Yap	Nationalist People's Coalition	208,195	82.01
Faustino T. Galang II	PDP–Laban	45,668	17.99
Total		253,863	100.00
Source: "2022 NLE". COMELEC.

=== 3rd District ===
Candidate	Party	Votes	%
Noel N. Rivera	Nationalist People's Coalition	114,223	48.28
Andres Lacson	Aksyon Demokratiko	83,866	35.45
Jose Antonio T. Feliciano	Independent	38,484	16.27
Total		236,573	100.00
Source: "2022 NLE". COMELEC.

== Tawi-Tawi ==
Candidate	Party	Votes	%
Dimszar M. Sali	National Unity Party	91,828	51.26
Ruby Sahali	PDP–Laban	86,704	48.40
Shepard R. Reyes	PDP–Laban	599	0.33
Total		179,131	100.00

== Valenzuela ==
=== 1st District ===
Candidate	Party	Votes	%
Rexlon T. Gatchalian	Nationalist People's Coalition	141,794	100.00
Total		141,794	100.00

=== 2nd District ===
Candidate	Party	Votes	%
Eric Martinez	PDP–Laban	132,241	72.33
Magtanggol Gunigundo I	Lingkod ng Mamamayan ng Valenzuela City	50,599	27.67
Total		182,840	100.00

== Zambales ==
=== 1st District ===
Candidate	Party	Votes	%
Jefferson F. Khonghun	Nacionalista Party	156,561	79.54
Ma. Milagros E. Habana-Magsaysay	PDP–Laban	40,262	20.46
Total		196,823	100.00

=== 2nd District ===
Candidate	Party	Votes	%
Doris Maniquiz	Sulong Zambales Party	144,060	62.13
Amor Deloso	Nationalist People's Coalition	76,906	33.17
Philip G. Camara	Independent	10,890	4.70
Total		231,856	100.00

== Zamboanga City ==
=== 1st District ===
Candidate	Party	Votes	%
Khymer Adan T. Olaso	Adelante Zamboanga Party	73,785	49.43
Ma. Isabelle G. Climaco-Salazar	Partido Prosperidad y Amor Para na Zamboanga	55,829	37.40
Wendell F. Sotto	Lakas–CMD	13,679	9.16
Allain P. Alibasa	Independent	2,630	1.76
Taib H. Nasaron	Independent	1,896	1.27
Nur-Asia M. Awis	Partido Federal ng Pilipinas	1,448	0.97
Total		149,267	100.00
Source: "2022 NLE". COMELEC.

=== 2nd District ===
Candidate	Party	Votes	%
Manuel Jose M. Dalipe	Lakas–CMD	88,784	53.99
Jerry E. Perez	Laban ng Demokratikong Pilipino	58,461	35.55
Juan Climaco P. Elago II	Partido Prosperidad y Amor Para na Zamboanga	11,304	6.87
Mohammad Sali L. Ammang	Independent	4,526	2.75
Fictal J. Majuddin	Independent	1,382	0.84
Total		164,457	100.00
Source: "2022 NLE". COMELEC.

== Zamboanga del Norte ==
=== 1st District ===
Candidate	Party	Votes	%
Roberto T. Uy Jr	PDP–Laban	69,591	48.19
Romeo Jalosjos Jr.	Nacionalista Party	69,109	47.86
Frederico P. Jalosjos	National Unity Party	5,424	3.76
Richard E. Amazon	Partido Pederal ng Maharlika	288	0.20
Total		144,412	100.00
Source: "2022 NLE". COMELEC.

=== 2nd District ===
Candidate	Party	Votes	%
Glona Labadlabad	PDP–Laban	163,853	93.44
Sonia D. Cabigon	Independent	11,509	6.56
Total		175,362	100.00
Source: "2022 NLE". COMELEC.

=== 3rd District ===
Candidate	Party	Votes	%
Adrian Michael A. Amatong	Liberal Party	89,618	49.81
Cesar G. Jalosjos	Nacionalista Party	69,414	38.58
Joventino V. Diamante	PROMDI	19,691	10.94
Moises B. Aballe Jr.	Independent	1,194	0.66
Total		179,917	100.00
Source: "2022 NLE". COMELEC.

== Zamboanga del Sur ==
=== 1st District ===
Candidate	Party	Votes	%
Divina Grace Yu	PDP–Laban	166,432	52.89
Edmario S. Revelo	People's Reform Party	131,421	41.77
Archie T. Yongco	Nationalist People's Coalition	15,581	4.95
Delfin C. Supapo	Reform	1,223	0.39
Total		314,657	100.00
Source: "2022 NLE". COMELEC.

=== 2nd District ===
Candidate	Party	Votes	%
Jeyzel Victoria C. Yu	PDP–Laban	104,055	49.04
Leonardo L. Babasa Jr	Lakas–CMD	61,073	28.78
Antonio Cerilles	Nationalist People's Coalition	47,065	22.18
Total		212,193	100.00
Source: "2022 NLE". COMELEC.

== Zamboanga Sibugay ==
=== 1st District ===
Candidate	Party	Votes	%
Wilter Y. Palma I	Lakas–CMD	77,268	59.65
Anna Florence A. Cabilao-Yambao	Partido Pilipino sa Pagbabago	52,269	40.35
Total		129,537	100.00

=== 2nd District ===
Candidate	Party	Votes	%
Antonieta R. Eudela-Aniñon	Lakas–CMD	79,703	46.29
George K. Hofer II	Nacionalista Party	78,297	45.48
Eldwin M. Alibutdan	Partido Pilipino sa Pagbabago	13,182	7.66
Josefino P. Bael	Independent	992	0.58
Total		172,174	100.00
