= Ampersand Network =

Former Australian not-for-profit organisation

The Ampersand Network was a not-for-profit organisation, committed to improving the appeal and accessibility of volunteering for young people in Australia.

Ampersand was founded on the belief that exposing young people to social and environmental need will produce a more broad-minded and socially engaged generation of leaders than might otherwise emerge.

Since its launch in 2005, the Ampersand Network has provided access to over 5,000 volunteer opportunities Australia wide, and hundreds more with international development agencies abroad, such as Australian Volunteers International, Students Partnership Worldwide and Global Vision International.

Each year, the Ampersand Walk gives young Australians the opportunity to 'volunteer their feet' for not-for-profit organisations with a proven track record in utilising young volunteers. In 2007, Ampersand partnered with yconnect? to promote the Walk and raise funds for the Australian Red Cross.

The Ampersand Network's website was last updated in April 2011.

== Recognition ==
Two of its directors were Victorian finalists in the Young Australian of the Year.

In 2004, the network was applauded for its work in The Australian Senate. In 2005, it was the recipient of an Anti-Poverty Award for Young Victorians.
