= Wierde =

Sub-municipality of the city of Namur, Belgium

Wierde Wiyete (Walloon)
- Sub-municipality of Namur
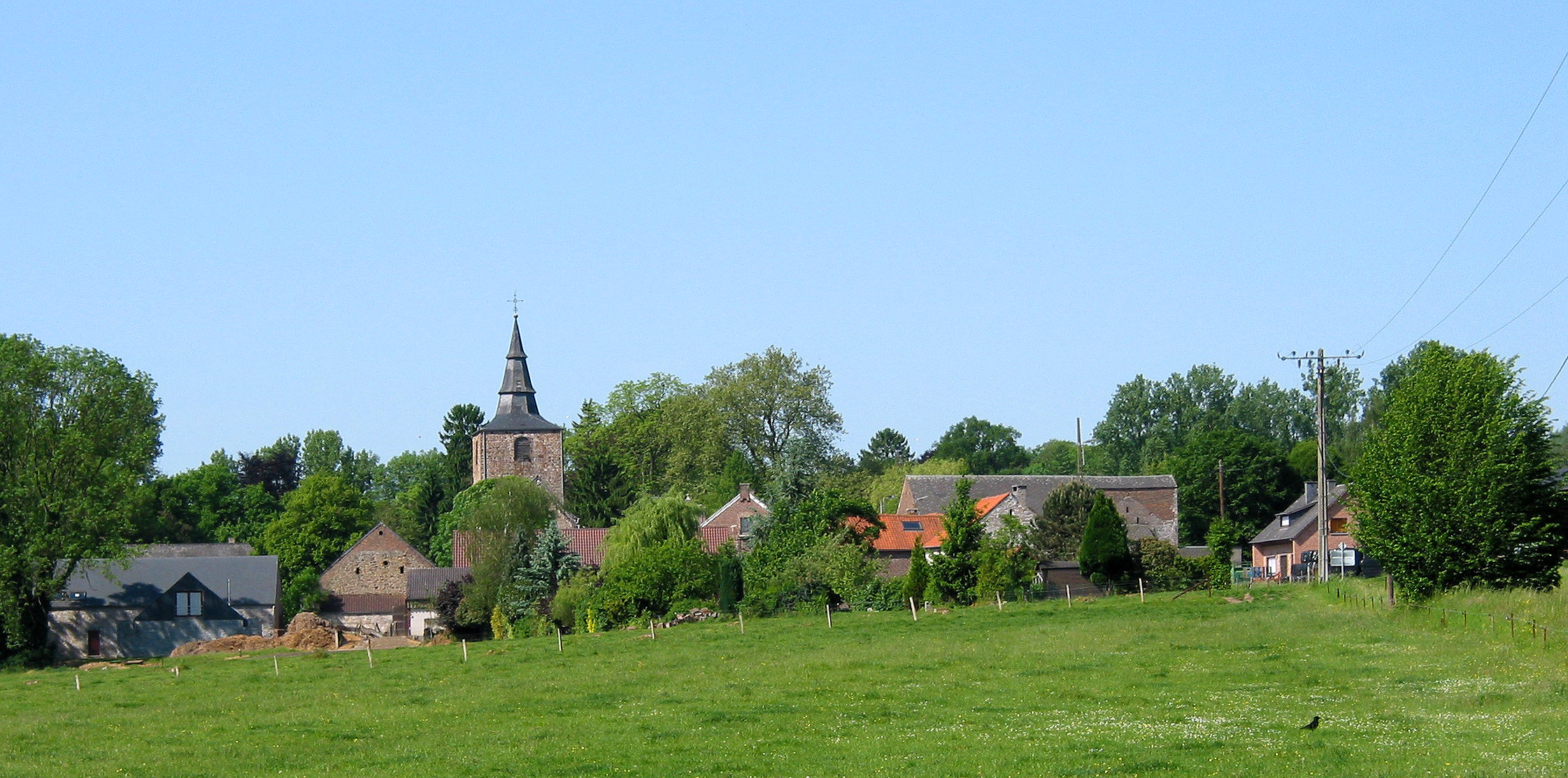

- Location of Wierde in Namur
- Interactive map of Wierde
- Location within Belgium Location within Namur Province
- Coordinates: 50°25′00″N 4°57′00″E
- Country: Belgium
- Community: French Community
- Region: Wallonia
- Province: Namur
- Arrondissement: Namur
- Municipality: Namur

Area
  - Total: 11.50 km^{2} (4.44 sq mi)

Population (2020-01-01)
  - Total: 1,793
  - Density: 155.9/km^{2} (403.8/sq mi)
- Postal codes: 5100
- Area codes: 081

Wierde (French pronunciation: [vjɛʁd]; Walloon: Wiyete) is a sub-municipality of the city of Namur located in the province of Namur, Wallonia, Belgium. It was a separate municipality until 1977. On 1 January 1977, it was merged into Namur.
