= & (theatre) =

Theatre in Espoo, Finland

Coordinates: 60°10′17″N 24°48′16″E

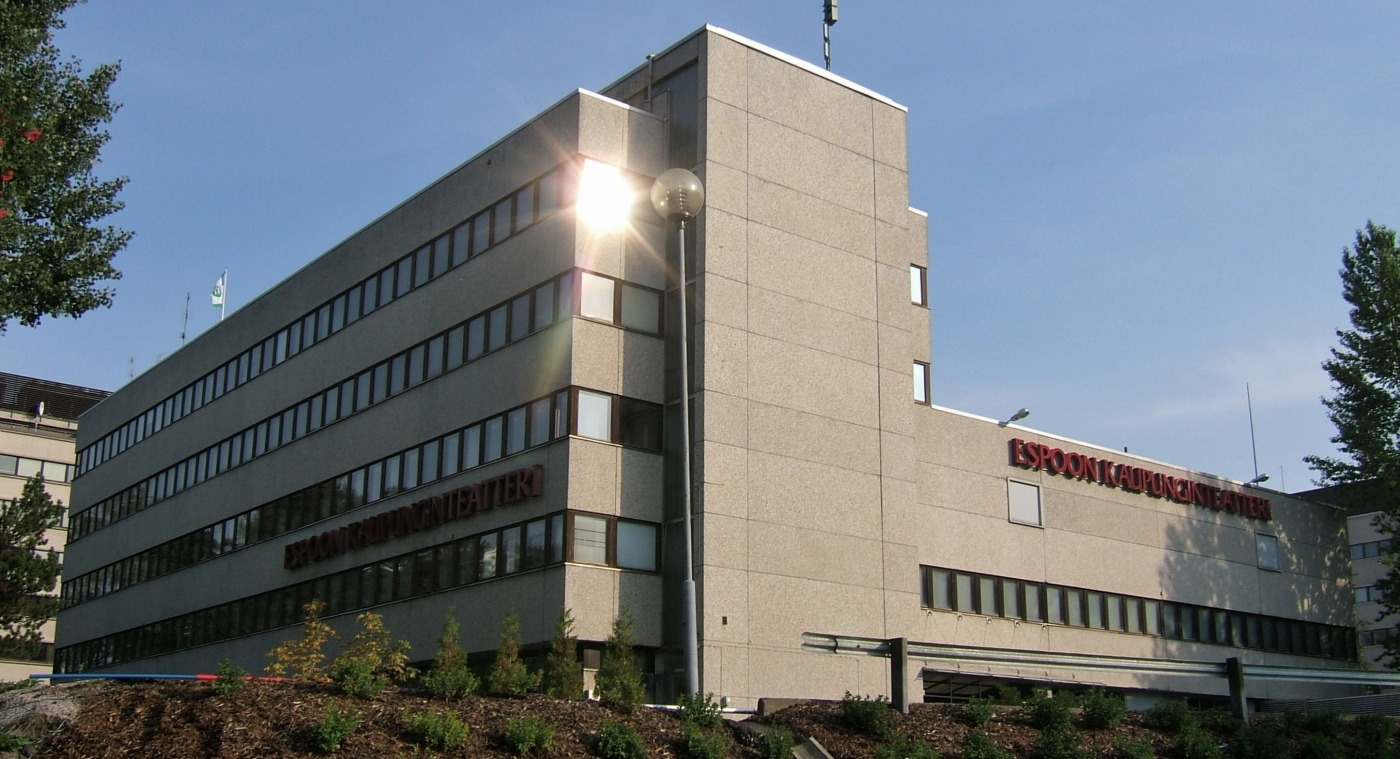
Revontulihalli on Revontulentie

& (until 2023 Espoo City Theatre) is a professional theatre operating in Espoo, Finland. It is maintained by the Espoo City Theatre Foundation, established in 1988. From 2017 to 2024, the theatre was led by Erik Söderblom. In 2024, Jussi Sorjanen took over as the Artistic Director.

The theatre mounts its own productions and hosts up to 10 international guest performances annually. It offers subtitles through its own mobile application. An English translation is always available, and some performances also have Finnish subtitles. The theatre attracts around 30,000 visitors annually.

The theatre has two main performance venues: Louhisali and Revontulihalli, both located in the Tapiola district – Louhisali in the Espoo Cultural Centre and Revontulihalli on Revontulentie.

== New name ==
In August 2023, the theatre announced its new name as "&". Artistic director Erik Söderblom described it as a "positive provocation" that highlights "community, cooperation, and togetherness." According to the theatre, the sign "&" symbolises combining things and ideas as well as bringing performers, audiences and cultures together; additionally, the sign "&" is pronounced as "et", which can also be interpreted as the initials of "Espoon teatteri", meaning the Espoo theatre.

The new name is the result of a two-year branding process, involving theatre representatives and advertising agencies Open Flower, TBWA, and Great Apes. Ulla Onkamo, a language planning specialist from the Institute for the Languages of Finland, criticized the name change as unclear and impractical. She argued that & says nothing about its subject and doesn't even appear to be a name. The Finnish Association of Visual Communication Designers, Grafia, awarded the &-logo the Gold Peak of Design at the 2023 Vuoden huiput gala. A total of 14 works received the Gold Peak Award, and 40 works received the Silver Peak Award.
