= Katja Andy =

- Born: Käthe Aschaffenburg; 23 May 1907; Monchengladbach, Kingdom of Prussia, German Empire
- Died: 30 December 2013 (aged 106) New York, United States
- Genres: Classical
- Occupation(s): Musician, music professor
- Instrument: Piano

Katja Andy (born Käthe Aschaffenburg; 23 May 1907 – 30 December 2013) was a German-American classical pianist and piano professor.

== Biography ==
=== Youth and first career steps in Germany ===
Katja Andy was born Käthe Aschaffenburg in 1907 in Mönchengladbach, Prussia, German Empire. She was the younger child of Otto Aschaffenburg (1869–1933), a Jewish fabric manufacturer, and his wife, Clara (née Ruben), an amateur pianist who had studied the piano with Clara Schumann. She started playing the piano at the age of three. Her parents were musical patrons and used to accommodate touring soloists of the local philharmonic concerts at the family home, including stars like Adolf Busch, Joseph Szigeti, Eugen d’Albert, and Walter Gieseking. Pianist Edwin Fischer eventually became a close friend of the family. In 1924, she moved to Berlin to study with Edwin Fischer and Michael Wittels. She also attended piano lessons by Artur Schnabel.

From 1927, she gave duo concerts with pianist Agi Jambor. From 1930, she often played with Edwin Fischer's chamber orchestra and was his solo partner in the Mozart double concerto. In Bach's concertos for multiple keyboards, her fellow student and lifelong friend Grete Sultan joined Fischer and Aschaffenburg. For the 1933–34 season, 60 concert dates had already been fixed.

=== Emigration to France ===
This promising start of a concert career was cut short by Adolf Hitler's rise to power in January 1933. When the Nazi regime told her she was not allowed to teach "Aryan" students anymore, she fled Germany to Paris in April 1933, taking the name Katja Andy, which she used thereafter. Her brother, Rudolf, had fled to Britain in 1933, where his mother followed in 1939. Otto Aschaffenburg died in 1933. As a German national, Katja was not allowed to work in France, either. She was required to register weekly with the French police and lived off clandestine payments from Edwin Fischer. and earnings from small jobs as a répétiteur and ballet school pianist. After she was denounced in 1937, she managed to flee back to Germany by train without a valid passport to try to obtain an emigration permit. With the help of her dressmaker, an acquaintance of Hermann Göring, she managed to obtain the necessary visa. The dressmaker, a Christian, and her Jewish boyfriend, were less fortunate.

=== United States ===
In 1937, she emigrated to the United States, She accompanied dancer Lotte Goslar on a national tour, before she settled in Detroit in 1938. Shortly after the war, she became a naturalized U.S. citizen in 1945. In 1948, she took up a teaching position at DePaul University in Chicago. In 1958, she became friends with Austrian pianist Alfred Brendel, himself a student of Edwin Fischer, whom she met at the festival of Lucerne, Switzerland. From 1960, she lived in New York City, before she moved to Boston in 1964. There she first taught at the Boston Conservatory, and later took up a professorship at Boston's New England Conservatory. She stayed there into the 1980s and was honoured with an honorary doctorate from her faculty.

== Last years and death ==
From 1991, Katja Andy spent her retirement in New York City. She died on 30 December 2013, at the age of 106.

== Bibliography ==
- Moritz von Bredow: 2012. Rebellische Pianistin. Das Leben der Grete Sultan zwischen Berlin und New York (Biography). Schott Music, Mainz, Germany; ISBN 978-3-7957-0800-9 (NOTE: contains a description of her friendship with Grete Sultan, a separate biographic entry and two photographs).
- Alfred Brendel: Eine Musikerin der seltensten Art. Zum 100. Geburtstag der Pianistin Katja Andy, Neue Zürcher Zeitung (in German)
