= Ampersand (company) =

Rwandan electricity and electric vehicle company

- Type: Private
- Industry: Energy technology; Electric vehicles
- Founded: 2016; 10 years ago in Kigali, Rwanda
- Website: ampersand.energy

Ampersand is a Rwandan energy company and electric vehicle (EV) manufacturer. The company manages the largest vehicle charging network in Rwanda and Kenya. The CEO and primary founder of Ampersand is Josh Whale.

== History ==
Ampersand was founded in 2016 by four entrepreneurs from different countries. It was initially created as an EV infrastructure company, building a network of battery swap stations. The company began manufacturing electric motorcycles (e-motos) in Kigali in 2018. Ampersand's commercial launch was in May 2019 with 20 e-moto taxis, becoming the first African company to produce commercial electric motorcycles. Ampersand manufactured and deployed its thousandth vehicle in February 2024, increasing to 2,750 within Rwanda by May 2025.

In 2019, Rwanda announced plans to replace the over 100,000 motorbikes in Rwanda with electric motorcycles. Their subsequent initiatives, such as waiving all import taxes on electric vehicles, rent-free land for charing stations, and subsidies on renewable energy, helped Ampersand's growth.

Ampersand launched in Nairobi, Kenya in late 2022; by May 2024, they had sold 655 electric motorcycles in Kenya, roughly a fifth of the electric motorcycles in the country. By that month, Ampersand had produced approximately 70% of all registered electric motorcycle taxis in Rwanda. In May 2025, they had captured 90% of Rwanda's e-moto market.

In June 2024, Ampersand signed a memorandum of understanding with Chinese EV company BYD, with Ampersand promising to purchase enough battery cells from BYD to build approximately 40,000 electric vehicles by the end of 2026.

In December 2025, Ampersand opened its battery swap network to global EV manufacturers, with Wylex Mobility becoming the first manufacturer to join. By the end of 2025, Ampersand was facilitating over 20,000 battery swaps a day across Kenya and Rwanda.

=== Funding ===
Ampersand raised US$3.5 million from the Ecosystem Integrity Fund in April 2021. In late 2023, the Africa Go Green Fund provided $7.5 million in debt financing to Ampersand to expand battery development and production. The company secured a Series A round of $19.5 million funding in January 2024, with an additional $2 million in August from AHL Venture Partners, Beyond Capital, and Everstrong Capital, among other investors. In August 2025, they completed another funding round, receiving US$7 million from British International Investment, with unknown amounts raised from other donors.

== Products and services ==
Ampersand's flagship product is their electric motorcycle, Alpha (renamed from "Ampersand" in May 2025).

Ampersand began by manufacturing and assembling all of its motorbikes in Kigali, with their lithium iron phosphate batteries designed by Ampersand engineers and manufactured abroad. In October 2024, they opened an additional 21,000 square meter factory in Nairobi.

When purchasing the motorbike, Ampersand separates the cost of the battery from the cost of the motorcycle, reducing up-front costs. The company also provides financing plans for customers who cannot pay up front.

They have at least 32 battery swap stations across Kigali and Nairobi. Ampersand provides an app to monitor battery levels and find nearby swap stations. They use predictive algorithms based on battery data to maximize their lifespan. Ampersand also works with Rwandan e-cycling company SLS Energy to repurpose old e-bike batteries for low cost local energy grids.

Ampersand's battery swap stations are powered by a combination of solar and fossil fuels. They partnered with CrossBoundary Energy in 2024 to begin installing solar panels at their battery stations.
