= Andi =

Andi or ANDI may refer to:

== People and fictional characters ==
- Andy (given name), including people and fictional characters with the name Andi
- Andi people, an ethnic group of Dagestan, Russia

== Places ==
- Andi, Guizhou, a town in Jinsha County, Guizhou, China
- Andi, Shandong, a town in Yinan County, Shandong, China
- Andi, Zhejiang, a town in Jinhua, Zhejiang, China
- Andi, Estonia, a village in Haljala Parish, Lääne-Viru County, Estonia
- Andi, Republic of Dagestan, Russia, a rural locality

== Other uses ==
- Andi language, a Northeast Caucasian language
- ANDi, a rhesus monkey
- Aggregate Nutrient Density Index
- American Nitrox Divers International (Now ANDI, International)
- andi, AND Immediate, an RISC-V instruction

== See also ==
- Andy (disambiguation)
- And I (disambiguation)
- AND1, an American shoe and clothing company
