= English ship St Andrew (1622) =

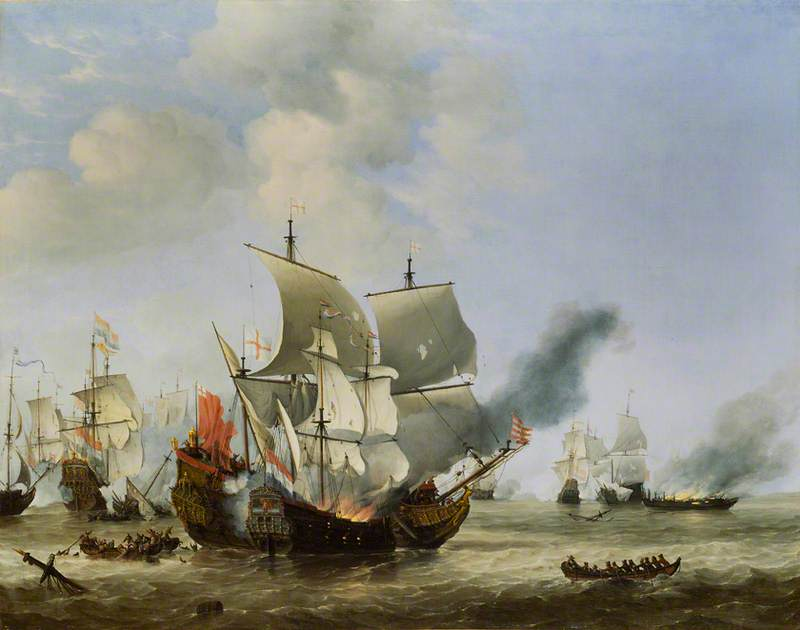
- The Burning of the Andrew at the Battle of Scheveningen in 1653, by Willem van de Velde the younger

History

England
- Name: St Andrew
- Builder: William Burrell, Deptford Dockyard
- Launched: 1622
- Commissioned: 1623
- Fate: Driven ashore and wrecked near Rye, East Sussex, September 1666

General characteristics
- Class & type: 42-gun great ship
- Tons burthen: 587
- Length: 110 ft (34 m) (keel)
- Beam: 37 ft (11 m)
- Depth of hold: 16 ft 6 in (5.03 m)
- Sail plan: Full-rigged ship
- Complement: 280 (peacetime), 360 (active service)
- Armament: Originally 42 guns of various weights of shot, increased to 66 in 1666

The St Andrew was a 42-gun great ship or Second rate of the Navy of the Kingdom of England, built by William Burrell (Master Shipwright of the East India Company) at Deptford Dockyard and launched in 1622. In 1649 she became part of the navy of the Commonwealth of England (renamed just Andrew), but in 1660 at the Stuart Restoration she became part of the new Royal Navy, resuming her original name as HMS St Andrew.

The ship first saw action as part of the expeditionary force to Cádiz in 1625, and was taken over by Parliament when the First English Civil War began in August 1642. Known as Andrew until the 1660 Stuart Restoration, most of her service during the Wars of the Three Kingdoms was spent supporting coastal operations. These included an attack on Pendennis Castle, one of the last Royalist holdouts in Cornwall; in a letter dated 30 June 1646, Sir William Batten, its Parliamentarian captain, wrote to his superior that

Sir, I believe the castle of Pendennis will not be long out of our hands; a dogger boat with four guns I have taken, whereof one Kedgwin of Penzant was captain, a notable active knave against the Parliament, and had the King's commission; and now would fain be a merchant man, and was balasted with salt and had divers letters in her for Pendennis castle...

After taking part in the First Anglo-Dutch War and being severely damaged during the Second, she was refitted and her armament upgraded to 66 guns. On 3 September 1666, she was driven ashore by a storm near Rye, East Sussex; it was decided repairs would be too expensive and two months later she was stripped of her fittings and broken up.
