= 2016 Bacoor local elections =

Philippine election

2016 Bacoor mayoral election
- May 9, 2016
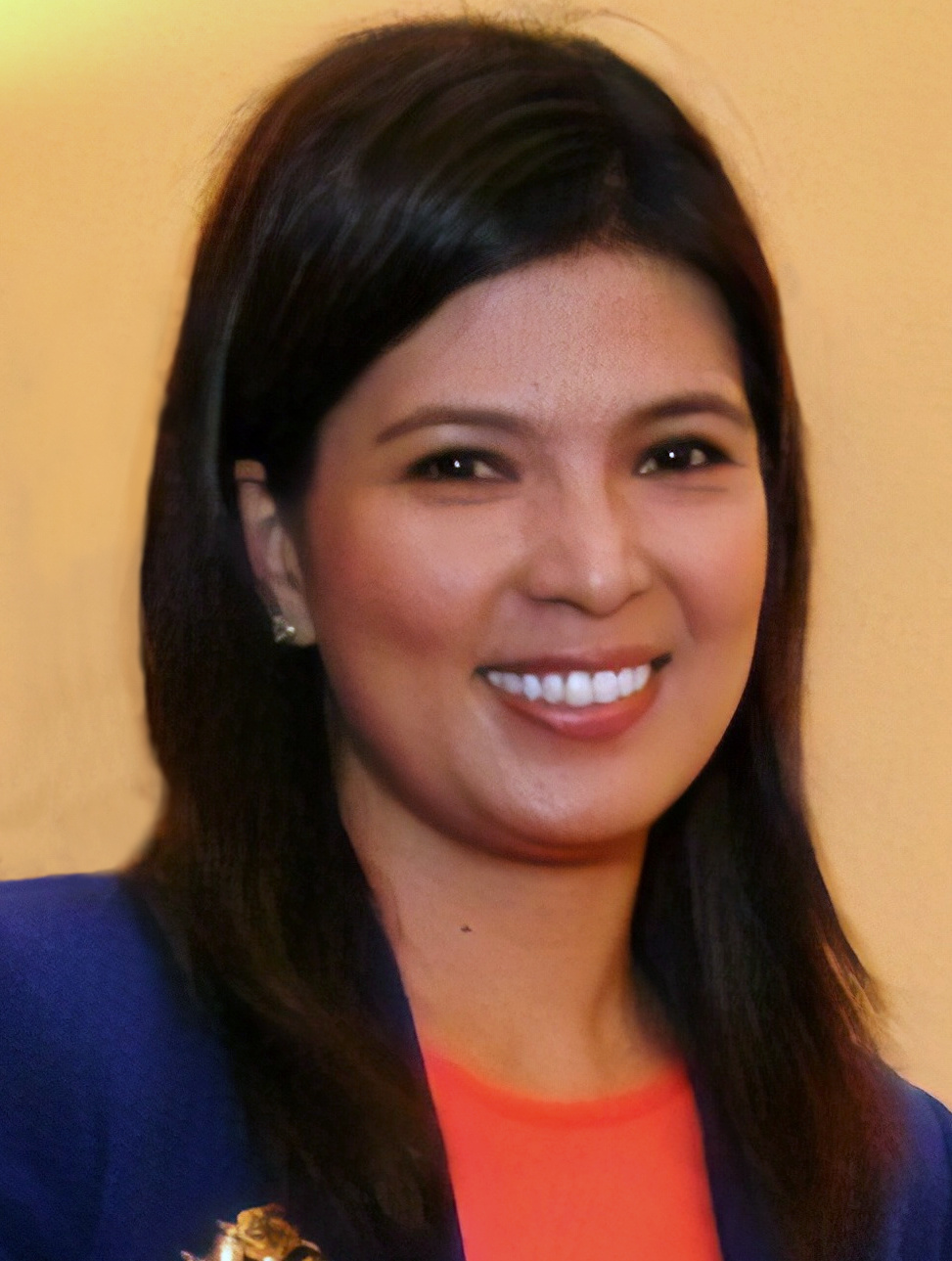
Nominee	Lani Mercado-Revilla	Rolando Remulla	Edwin Malvar
Party	Lakas	NUP	Liberal
Running mate	Catherine Sariño-Evaristo	Allen Reyes	Cesario Del Rosario, Jr.
Popular vote	106,964	47,399	21,184
Percentage	60.93	27.00	12.07
Mayor before election
Edwin "Strike" Revilla
Lakas
Elected mayor
Lani Mercado-Revilla
Lakas

Philippine House of Representatives election at 2nd District of Cavite (Lone District of Bacoor)
- May 9, 2016
Nominee	Edwin "Strike" Revilla	Mark Orlie Buena
Party	Lakas	Liberal
Popular vote	141,468	16,228
Percentage	89.71	10.29
Representative before election
Lani Mercado-Revilla
Lakas
Elected Representative
Edwin "Strike" Revilla
Lakas

Local elections were held in Bacoor on May 9, 2016, within the Philippine general election. The voters will elect for the elective local posts in the city: the mayor, the vice mayor, the lone district representative, the two provincial board members for Cavite, and the twelve councilors, six in each of the city's two local legislative districts (Note: As per Article 4 Section 10 of Republic Act 10160 or the City Charter of Bacoor, Bacoor's Sangguniang Panglungsod districts should be officially referred to as Bacoor West and Bacoor East. They are currently referred to on orders of the city government as Districts 1 and 2, respectively.).

== Background ==
Incumbent Edwin "Strike" Revilla is already in his third term as mayor of Bacoor; therefore he is disqualified from running for another term for the same position despite Bacoor's change in status as a city in 2012. He will be running for representative to switch positions with his sister-in-law, Lani Mercado-Revilla. Her opponents are former municipal vice mayor and provincial board member Edwin Malvar and incumbent provincial board member Rolando "Andoy" Remulla.

On the other hand, incumbent vice mayor Catherine Sariño-Evaristo will be Representative Mercado-Revilla's running mate. Her announced opponents are former city Business Permits and Licensing Office head Allen Reyes and former municipal councilor and three-term provincial board member Cesario "Jun" Del Rosario Jr., who recently is an executive producer, editor and deputy chief of reporters at CNN Philippines.

== Results ==
The candidates for mayor, vice mayor, and district representative with the highest number of votes wins the seat; they are voted separately, therefore, they may be of different parties when elected.

Incumbent officials are expressed in italics.

=== Mayor ===
Bacoor Mayoralty Election
Party	Candidate	Votes	%
Lakas	Lani Mercado-Revilla	106,964	60.93%
NUP	Rolando Remulla	47,399	27.00%
Liberal	Edwin Malvar	21,184	12.07%
Total votes		175,547	100.00%
Lakas hold			

=== Vice Mayor ===
Bacoor Vice Mayoralty Election
Party	Candidate	Votes	%
Lakas	Catherine Sariño-Evaristo	100,769	62.78%
NUP	Allen Enriquez Reyes	34,287	21.36%
Liberal	Cesario Del Rosario, Jr.	25,449	15.86%
Total votes		160,505	100.00%
Lakas hold			

=== District Representative ===
Incumbent mayor Strike Revilla is switching positions with his sister-in-law. He is said to be running unopposed as his perceived opponent, former municipal mayor Jessie Castillo, decided not to run for any position in this year's elections.

2016 Philippine House of Representatives election in 2nd District of Cavite (Lone District of Bacoor)
Party	Candidate	Votes	%
Lakas	Edwin "Strike" Revilla	141,468	89.71%
Liberal	Mark Orlie Buena	16,228	10.29%
Total votes		157,696	100.00%
Lakas hold			

=== Provincial Board members ===
Voters will elect two board members at-large, regardless of whether these voters are from Bacoor West or Bacoor East. Incumbent board member Edralin "Aba" Gawaran, who was nationally known as one of the right-hand men of detained Senator Ramon "Bong" Revilla Jr. when he was arrested and taken to jail for corruption charges in 2014 in connection with the PDAF scam, will vie for re-election. His partner for the other slot within Team Revilla is graduating city councilor Reynaldo Fabian. They will be opposed by former three-term municipal councilor Peter Simon Lara, transport operator and businessperson Neil Ragasa, and Rosalina Francisco.

Remulla, the other incumbent board member, is running for mayor.

2016 Provincial Board Election in 2nd District of Cavite (Lone District of Bacoor)
Party	Candidate	Votes	%
Lakas	Edralin Gawaran	104,739	39.82%
Lakas	Reynaldo Fabian	92,350	35.11%
Nacionalista	Honesto Mercado Jr.	21,895	8.32%
Liberal	Rosalina Francisco	20,787	7.90%
NUP	Cornelio Ragasa	16,028	6.09%
Liberal	Lucio Alejo IV	7,167	2.72%
Total votes		262,966	100.00%

=== Councilors ===
==== Team Revilla ====
Lakas-CMD/Team Revilla Bacoor West District
Name	Party	Result
Miguel Bautista	Lakas	won
Rowena Bautista-Mendiola	Lakas	won
Venus De Castro	Lakas	won
Edwin Gawaran	Lakas	won
Alejandro Gutierrez	Lakas	won
Michael Solis	Lakas	won

Lakas-CMD/Team Revilla Bacoor East District
Name	Party	Result
Apolonio Advincula	Lakas	won
Leandro De Leon	Lakas	won
Hernando "King" Gutierrez	Lakas	won
Roberto Javier	Lakas	won
Gaudencio Nolasco	Lakas	won
Reynaldo Palabrica	Lakas	won

==== Team Malvar ====
Liberal Party/Team Malvar Bacoor West District
Name	Party	Result
Angelito Antonio	Liberal	lost
Danilo Frani	Liberal	lost
Norlinda Madale	Liberal	lost
Eliseo Mira	Liberal	lost
James Donald Manalili	Liberal	lost
Jaime Ocampo	Liberal	lost

Liberal Party/Team Malvar Bacoor East District
Name	Party	Result
Jose Almario, Jr.	Liberal	lost
Yolando Asuncion	Liberal	lost
Analiza Gayamo	Liberal	lost
Fernando Lachica	Liberal	lost
Leopoldo Platilla	Liberal	lost
Tranquilino Silva	Liberal	lost

==== Team Andoy ====
National Unity Party/Team Andoy Bacoor West District
Name	Party	Result
Alex Garcia	NUP	lost
Garry Gawaran	NUP	lost
Norman Lacson	NUP	lost
Lourdes Ocampo	NUP	lost
Luis Pamaran	NUP	lost
Zairel Ramos	NUP	lost

National Unity Party/Team Andoy Bacoor East District
Name	Party	Result
Nomer De Quiroz	NUP	lost
Leonilo Javier, Jr.	NUP	lost
Danilo Legaspi	NUP	lost
Teodoro Montes	NUP	lost
Narciso Nato	NUP	lost
Jay Sapanghila	NUP	lost

==== Results ====
Each legislative district elects six councilors to the City Council. The six candidates with the highest number of votes wins these seats.

===== Bacoor West District =====
Bacoor City Council election - Bacoor West
Party	Candidate	Votes	%
Lakas	Rowena Bautista-Mendiola	59,917	12.15%
Lakas	Miguel Bautista	59,157	11.99%
Lakas	Edwin Gawaran	58,866	11.93%
Lakas	Michael Solis	57,730	11.70%
Lakas	Venus De Castro	55,014	11.15%
Lakas	Alejandro Gutierrez	45,228	9.17%
Liberal	James Manalili	21,741	6.41%
NUP	Norman Lacson	20,995	4.26%
NUP	Zairel Ramos	18,456	3.74%
NUP	Garry Gawaran	14,618	2.96%
NUP	Lourdes Ocampo	13,977	2.83%
NUP	Alex Garcia	12,079	2.45%
Liberal	Jaime Ocampo	11,375	2.31%
NUP	Luis Pamaran	9,539	1.93%
Liberal	Danilo Frani	7,968	1.62%
Liberal	Angelito Antonio	7,116	1.44%
Liberal	Eliseo Mira	5,997	1.22%
Liberal	Norlinda Madale	5,559	1.13%
PDP–Laban	Danny Paez	4,029	0.82%
PDP–Laban	Maximo Cabrera	3,939	0.80%
Total votes		493,300	100.00%

===== Bacoor East District =====
Bacoor City Council election - Bacoor East
Party	Candidate	Votes	%
Lakas	Apolonio Advincula Jr.	46,063	12.41%
Lakas	Reynaldo Palabrica	42,246	11.38%
Lakas	Hernando Gutierrez	40,646	10.95%
Lakas	Gaudencio Nolasco	36,153	9.74%
Lakas	Leandro De Leon	32,326	8.71%
Lakas	Roberto Javier	32,059	8.63%
Nacionalista	Roberto Saquitan	19,369	5.22%
NUP	Leonilo Javier Jr.	15,727	4.24%
NUP	Jay Sapanghila	15,259	4.11%
NUP	Danilo Legaspi	12,865	3.46%
NUP	Narciso Nato	12,545	3.38%
NUP	Teodoro Montes	10,859	2.92%
NUP	Nomer De Quiroz	10,035	2.70%
Liberal	Analiza Gayamo	7,959	2.14%
Liberal	Tranquilino Silva	5,987	1.61%
Liberal	Leopoldo Platilla	5,780	1.56%
Liberal	Fernando Lachica	5,648	1.52%
PRP	Denis Lopez	5,312	1.43%
Liberal	Yolando Asuncion	5,299	1.43%
PDP–Laban	George Salazar	4,650	1.25%
Liberal	Jose Almario Jr.	4,522	1.22%
Total votes		371,309	100.00%
