= And =

And or AND may refer to:

== Logic, grammar and computing ==
- Conjunction (grammar), connecting two words, phrases, or clauses
- Logical conjunction in mathematical logic, notated as "∧", "⋅", "&", or simple juxtaposition
- Bitwise AND, a Boolean operation in programming, typically notated as "and" or "&"
- Short-circuit and, a short-circuit operator, notated "&&", "and", "and then", etc.
- Ampersand, the symbol "&", representing "and"
- AND gate, in electronics

== Arts ==
=== Film ===
- And, a former name of the 2024 film Kinds of Kindness
- And (film), 1940s experimental film

=== Music ===
- And (John Martyn album), 1996
- And (Koda Kumi album), 2018
- A N D, a 2015 album by Tricot
- And, a 2007 album by Jonah Matranga
- and, a 2022 EP by Xaviersobased
- "And,", a 2024 maxi single by BoyNextDoor
- "And", a 2022 song by Monsta X from Shape of Love

== Businesses and organizations ==
- Alberta New Democrats, now Alberta New Democratic Party
- Academy of Nutrition and Dietetics, US
- AND Corporation, biometrics
- AND CO, software subsidiary of Fiverr

== Transportation ==
- Anderson Regional Airport, South Carolina, US, IATA airport code
- Anderston railway station, Scotland, National Rail code

== Other uses ==
- Allow natural death, a medical term
- Andorra, ISO 3166-1 alpha-3 and UNDP country code
- Andromeda (constellation), abbreviation
- Ansus language, ISO 639-3 code

== See also ==
- & (disambiguation)
- Ampersand (disambiguation)
