= St Helena Secondary School =

Secondary school on Saint Helena

Coordinates: 15.9513°S 5.7138°W

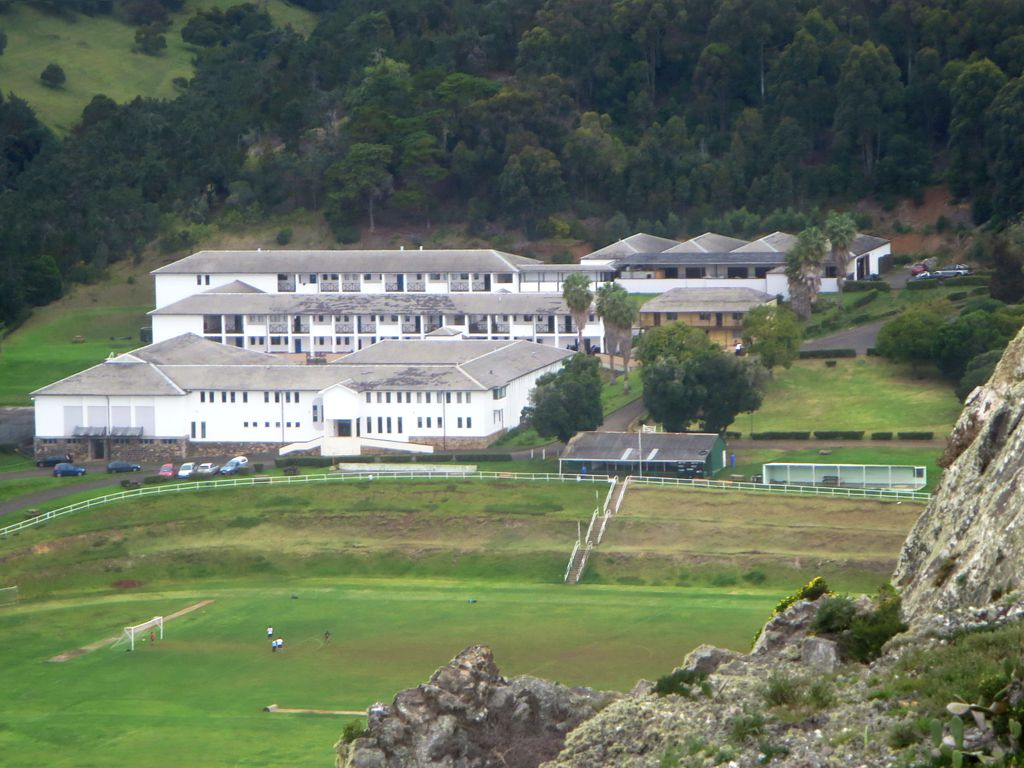
Prince Andrew School in 2014

St Helena Secondary School is the only secondary school on the island of Saint Helena, a British territory in the Atlantic Ocean. Formerly Prince Andrew School, the school changed its name on 13 May 2025 following a school vote.

It caters to years 7-13 and was opened in 1989 with member of parliament Mark Taylor presiding. Its 25th anniversary celebration was held on 3 October 2014. The establishment of the school was described by Denis Greenhill, Baron Greenhill of Harrow as "built after a miserly correspondence with London for over 20 years. In fact, it was only the prospect of a naval visit by His Royal Highness Prince Andrew that caused Her Majesty's Government to yield".

As of 2025, the headteacher is Philip Toal. In 2012, an advertisement placed to recruit a headteacher said that "a 'well developed sense of humour' would be an advantage". Previous headteachers included Penny Bowers (2023), Abraham Swart (?-2025) and Paul Starkie (2012-?).

The school had been named after Prince Andrew, Duke of York. In 2025, the government of St Helena announced that the school would change its name to something "neutral" following the allegations against the prince regarding his friendship with Jeffrey Epstein. Pupils were asked to suggest alternative names. The leading contender was to name it after a contemporary, Helena Bennett, the woman helping to preserve St Helena's wild landscapes for generations to come, but the name ultimately chosen was the name of the island.
