= List of Walang Hanggang Paalam episodes =

Walang Hanggang Paalam (International title: Irreplaceable / transl. Eternal Goodbye) is a Philippine television drama action series broadcast by Kapamilya Channel. It premiered on the network's Primetime Bida evening line up from September 28, 2020, to April 16, 2021, replacing A Soldier's Heart.

== Series overview ==
Season	Episodes	Originally released	
Season	Episodes	First released	Last released
1	143	September 28, 2020	April 16, 2021

- iWantTFC shows two episodes first in advance before it broadcasts on TV.

== Episodes ==
=== Season 1 ===
No. overall	No. in season	Title	Original release date	AGB Nielsen Ratings (NUTAM People)
1	1	"Global Premiere"	September 28, 2020	N/A
Emman Salvador is a young man unwittingly involved in a botched armed robbery and convicted of a crime he did not commit. His wife, Celine, leaves him, bringing their son, Robbie, with her, eventually starts a new life with Anton, a wealthy scion of a medical group organization. Anton has known and loved Celine all his life, because Celine's mother, Linda is a protege of his mother, Dr. Araceli Hernandez, prominent cardiologist, owner and founder of the A.Hernandez Medical Group. After several years appealing his wrongful conviction, and with help of his colleague Agent Samantha Agoncillo, Emman is cleared of the crime and is freed. He gets his life together, joins law enforcement and becomes a top level NIA agent. However, the loss of his family motivates Emman to resign from the agency and moves back with his father and brother in Alcala. He finds a stable job and lives a simple life in the province. Blessings continue to come Emman's way when he reunites with Robbie for the child's birthday celebration and finally buries the hatchet with Celine. However, Celine's fiancé Anton is jealous despite Celine's continued reassurance. As the family reunion nears its end, things turn for the worse when an unidentified man takes Robbie captive in broad daylight.
2	2	"Kidnap"	September 29, 2020	N/A
Celine is devastated over Robbie's kidnapping. In an undisclosed location, Dexter holds his former partner and nemesis’ son for revenge against Emman for the latter's testimony that convicted Dexter for the armed robbery. Meanwhile, Emman finds a possible lead that can identify Robbie's abductor.
3	3	"Manindigan"	September 30, 2020	N/A
The kidnappers demand ransom money in exchange for Robbie's freedom. Emman is doubtful over the circumstances surrounding his son's abduction. His guts tell him it is much bigger than a ransom for kidnapping. Tension erupts between Emman and Anton about what needs to be done in order to save Robbie. Amidst the conflict between Emman and Anton, Celine leans towards Emman's take on the kidnapping, largely because of her confidence in his investigative skills. Both believe the stakes are higher and this is not an ordinary kidnap for ransom.
4	4	"Tiwala"	October 1, 2020	N/A
Despite Emman's objections, Anton puts up the ransom money for Robbie and communicates with the kidnappers for the exchange. Things go south when Emman, whose hunch that meeting the ransom demands will not free Robbie, interrupts the exchange and the kidnappers flee. This piques Anton who is hoping to retrieve Robbie to gain Celine's gratitude and approval. Much to his disappointment, Celine agrees that their blunder further endangers her son's life. The absence of Robbie at the exchange point supports Emman's analysis. Later, Emman obtains possible leads from a video sent by the kidnappers. As he desperately searches for Robbie, Emman comes face-to-face with Dexter, his team partner at the armed robbery where he was wrongly convicted.
5	5	"Kasabwat"	October 2, 2020	N/A
Emman recognizes Dexter, surprised that he is not in prison. Emman contacts Sam, his former NIA colleague who helped him entrap Dexter years earlier. Sam learns he was quietly given an early release and suspects powerful forces in organized crime supporting him. She heads out to help Emman look for his son. Driven by jealousy, Anton suspects Emman has something to do with Robbie's abduction. Meanwhile, Emman pursues Dexter and the kidnappers.
6	6	"Bintang"	October 5, 2020	N/A
Sam promises to help Emman and urges her friend to return as an NIA agent. Meanwhile, Celine is outraged at Anton's behavior towards the Salvadors. Anton's jealousy over Emman's capabilities and Celine's reliance on him, drives him to irrational behaviors. Meanwhile, Emman appears to be right about the modus operandi of this kidnappers as all their solid leads come to dead ends. Emman and Sam suspect a large syndicate behind the child disappearances.
7	7	"Natuklasan"	October 6, 2020	N/A
Wary of Alcala's Chief of Police, Caloy breaks into Capt. Galang's office and discovers proof of his corrupt practices. Meanwhile, Emman and Sam continue to follow Dexter's tracks and discovers a bigger danger. It is a large syndicate that kidnapped Robbie.
8	8	"Pagtatagpo"	October 7, 2020	N/A
Going above and beyond to expose the truth, Caloy suddenly comes face-to-face with a chilling possibility when his heated confrontation with Capt. Galang goes wrong. Celine, meanwhile, receives a vital piece of information that will help her find Robbie. Armed with a newfound lead, Emman and Sam head out to track down the yacht owner, only to witness a shocking scene. Elsewhere, Anton starts to grow suspicious of his family when clues regarding the abduction of his fiancée's son fall into place.
9	9	"Pamilya Hernandez"	October 8, 2020	N/A
Emman comes to a dead end again when he fails to catch Juanito Galvez's killers despite being within his grasp. After watching the news about the yacht owner's death, Emman comes up with a plan to lure the men who took his son. Meanwhile, Anton insists on accompanying Celine to Rosales City to follow a lead on her son's whereabouts. However, he is shocked to find a familiar face at the hotel where he and his fiancée are checked in.
10	10	"Desisyon"	October 9, 2020	N/A
Anton becomes suspicious after seeing Franco Vergara with Amelia in Rosales City. Anton carries a family secret: his family's foundation and medical group is a front for a large syndicate dealing with the illegal organ trafficking black market. Upon seeing Franco, he is devastated to learn that the family organization is responsible for kidnapping his fiancé’s son. Confronting his sister, Dr. Amalia, she admits Robbie's heart is essential for her son, Lester, whose own heart is failing. Amalia, a cardiac surgeon, will perform transplant surgery on her son with Robbie's heart. Robbie happens to have the same rare blood type as Lester's. Devastated as he was to learn this, he faces his family's demands to sacrifice his fiance's son. The connection between the Hernandez family and the Organ traffic syndicate is not yet known. After Emman seeks the public's help in finding his missing son, an ally joins him and Sam in their search for Robbie. Meanwhile, Celine opens up to a priest about her regrets that have been troubling her heart following her son's abduction.
11	11	"Pag-asa"	October 12, 2020	N/A
Tension heightens between Emman and Anton over Anton's jealousy and Emman's frustration with the stalling investigation on Robbie's kidnapping. Celine insists on being in the midst of the action which raises Emman's concern over her safety, and piques Anton's jealousy as he witnesses their shared emotions over their son. She soon becomes a victim of Anton's anger as he fails to contain his rage when he sees Emman comfort Celine. Unsure about Anton's commitment to his family and his obsession over Celine's and Emman's growing closeness, Amelia orders Franco to tighten the security around Robbie and move Robbie to another location. She won't risk Anton returning Robbie to Celine. Meanwhile, one of Franco's staff at the Farm where the kidnapped children are housed, sees the 30 million pesos reward money for Robbie's safe return. She hatches a plan to return Robbie to the Salvadors for the reward money. She secretly takes Robbie and sends it to Emman.
12	12	"Ransom"	October 13, 2020	N/A
Armed with information on where the syndicate plan to move the children, Sonia, Robbie's caregiver, contacts Emman with details on their rendezvous point where they plan to exchange the money with their son. Meanwhile, Anton decides he will save Robbie for Celine and heads out to the farm. He witnesses Sonia and Andoy bring Robbie away from Franco and his men and follows them instead. At the rendezvous point, Emman and Celine see Robbie, but the exchange goes wrong when Anton decides that Celine and Emman will always have a connection through Robbie. He shoots Sonia, but Andoy spots him and escapes. Franco and his men arrive to intercept the rescue, and Robbie is recaptured. Andoy catches a glimpse of Anton before he runs away.
13	13	"Linlang"	October 14, 2020	N/A
The near failure of securing Robbie is a big concern for Amalia. She blames the near mishap to Anton's erratic decisions due to his obsession with Celine and promises her mother she will keep everything under control. The tail end of their phone conversation is overheard by Arnold who inquires what is happening. His mother dismisses his concern and Arnold takes offense at her offhand and vague response. He lashes out at his mother, claiming he is always excluded from family issues and storms out. Meanwhile, Emman meets Amalia at the hotel as he and Celine lament their failed rescue attempt of Robbie. Elsewhere, Anton catches up to Franco to check on Robbie and instructs Franco to make sure Celine and Emman are never given another chance to rescue their son. At the Hernandez home, Linda tries to cheer up Dr. Araceli, and both recall their relationship through the decades when the doctor supported Linda throughout her career and personal life journey. Linda expresses her gratitude for the doctor's constant support. Back at Alcala, the police invites Celine and Emman for questioning. At the hotel, Anton assures Amalia that Robbie is for her to do what she intends without any resistance on his part as long as Celine remains his.
14	14	"Areglo"	October 15, 2020	N/A
On the behest of Anton, Amalia calls on General Leo Chavez, to stop the investigation on Emman Salvador for his suspected involvement in the attempted rescue of Robbie. In exchange for allowing Amalia to harvest Robbie's heart for Lester, Anton is eager to show Emman that his family is bringing out the big guns to help Emman and Celine find their son. Later at the DNS (Department of National Security) headquarters, General Chavez is wrapping up his meeting discussing the pandemic and the criminal activities in the country. Colonel Gabriel “Gabo” Manzano apprises him of the steady increase in child kidnappings all over the country at a rate faster than previous decades. He believes the disappearances are all related to a large syndicate. The General seems troubled by the statement. That evening at the hotel, Anton and Amalia discuss their situation with Robbie and Emman. Amalia thanks Anton for choosing Lester over Robbie, because Anton agrees is the only way to sever Celine's connection with Emman. With Robbie out of the picture, he expects Celine would grow tired of searching for her son and eventually move on, and there would be no reason for Emman to be in their lives. Anton is confident he has Emman's trust and will know every move they make with regards to their search for Robbie. Searches and investigative leads that Anton can sabotage. He wants to make sure Robbie is harvested as soon as possible so a dead son is all they will find. Amalia is relieved that Anton no longer poses a threat to derailing her son's heart transplant operation. Earlier, Sam investigates a lead, a person of interest she notices grieving at the morgue near Sonia's body. She catches up to him and gets him to divulge the location of the Farm where they kept the children.
15	15	"Selos"	October 16, 2020	N/A
Acting on the information Andoy provides Sam after questioning him, she and Emman go to an abandoned villa in the outskirts of the city. They find evidence that its occupants were children. More importantly, Emman recognizes Robbie's drawings. He wonders why the kidnappers have such a big interest in his son. Despite the hefty reward money and the case garnering a high profile status in the media, the kidnappers continue to hold on to their son. The state of the abandoned but well maintained villa shows the children are well looked after, but the state of disarray indicates its occupants hastily moved out, seemingly evading the authorities. Emman rules out a revenge by Dexter because he has been eliminated. The kidnappers’ singling out Robbie makes him believe it is much more than child trafficking operation. Robbie has something more valuable than the ransom money and now begins to suspect an organ trafficking syndicate is behind this. Emman calls Celine to update her on Robbie's personal belongings found at the Villa. Hopeful yet fearful of what the kidnappers plan for her son, she is determined to join them as they continue to search for their son. At the Salvador's, Bernie and Nick have a heated discussion over Bernie's involvement in a brawl that cost him a night in jail. Bernie suffers from jealousy over Emman's magnetic personna, struggles under his older brother's shadow, mixed with his temper and impulsiveness, is always at the wrong side from his father's perspective. Elsewhere, after binging on alcohol the entire evening, Arnold ends up in his family's hospital after getting into an accident driving under the influence. He meets nurse Analyn who treats him without the awe and reverence he's used to getting from other female acquaintances when they realize he is an Hernandez. Later, his mother visits, reassuring him that he is loved. Arnold thinks they are hiding something from him, and no amount of reassurance from his mother helps his mental state.
16	16	"Peligro"	October 19, 2020	N/A
Colonel Manzano calls for a deep-dive investigation of all the child abduction cases reported in the last year. The increasing number of abductions around the country may not be coincidental. He assigns Major Dante Francisco to lead the team to ascertain whether his suspicions of a more organized group is in play. Meanwhile, Sam requests for a leave of absence so she can focus on helping Emman search and rescue his son. This angers Major Francisco who fires her for absence from her post without an approved leave. At the Hernandez hospital, something more sinister is happening in the basement of the building. Tucked deep below the building, in a restricted access area, lies an infrastructure that supports an international syndicate of organ traffickers. Dr. Amalia, her brother Anton and her mother Dr. Araceli are on a zoom call explaining the recent events surrounding Robbie Salvador's abduction. The Board is concerned about attracting visibility to a system that runs on invisibility. The recent headlines about Robbie is trending and most talked about. The Board questions Amalia's motives because Robbie is not in their organ donor database to begin with. Anton explodes, challenging those who are concerned to leave the organization. Meanwhile, Emman and his team (Sam, Caloy and Celine) try to figure out the letters Robbie wrote on his handkerchief: “Jaraniya.” Emman is sure his son wants to tell him something. He calls his father who has lived in the north all his life, and he confirms a Jaranilla Fish Port in Rosales. In that precise moment, at Jaranilla Port, Franco and his men are getting ready to transport the children by boat to a farm situated in a secluded island. As Emman and Celine head towards the port themselves, Anton calls and she tells him they are following a lead where they think Robbie is being held. Once again, Emman is able to follow their trail, much to the siblings’ frustration.
17	17	"Takas"	October 20, 2020	N/A
Amidst all the drama happening in the Hernandez and Salvador families, two sons from each family are creating conflicts on their own. Arnold will not stop his rebellion against his mother's and siblings’ because he feels he is not valued by them. Bernie is likewise, acting out and rebelling against his father's focus on Emman's problems rather than his. Meanwhile, Emman infiltrates the boat after disarming several of Franco's men. Celine slips by Sam and Caloy and by the time they notice her absence, she enters the dock and boards the boat as well. Franco lures Emman into the boat since he is earned by Anton. Franco removes Robbie from the boat and they head out to the farm by land. In the boat, Franco's men surprise Emman and beat him up to find out what he has learned about their organization so far. Celine comes up with a gun and Emman rushes to her. In the exchange of gunfire, the couple jump off the boat. At the dock, Anton arrives to find Sam and Caloy searching for Emman and Celine. Anton later learns that Emman is in their hands and being tortured for information. Franco is surprised when Anton asks about Celine's status. He did not see Celine when he left the boat.
18	18	"Stranded"	October 21, 2020	N/A
19	19	"Paraan"	October 22, 2020	N/A
20	20	"Kasagutan"	October 23, 2020	N/A
21	21	"Blackmail"	October 26, 2020	N/A
22	22	"Kapalit"	October 27, 2020	N/A
23	23	"Panawagan"	October 28, 2020	N/A
24	24	"Palabas"	October 29, 2020	N/A
25	25	"Koneksyon"	October 30, 2020	N/A
26	26	"Negosasyon"	November 2, 2020	N/A
27	27	"Foul Play"	November 3, 2020	N/A
28	28	"Bantay Sarado"	November 4, 2020	N/A
29	29	"Konektado"	November 5, 2020	N/A
30	30	"Patahimikin"	November 6, 2020	N/A
31	31	"Plano"	November 9, 2020	N/A
32	32	"Magpanggap"	November 10, 2020	N/A
33	33	"Dakpin"	November 11, 2020	N/A
34	34	"Donor"	November 12, 2020	N/A
35	35	"Dasal"	November 13, 2020	N/A
36	36	"Pangako"	November 16, 2020	N/A
Nick ends up getting wounded when the suspicious van that Emman is chasing begins shooting at them. As the day of Lester's operation nears, Amelia promises her son that she will save him no matter what it takes. Hoping to keep Robbie alive for his wedding with Celine to push through, Anton tries to convince Amelia and Araceli to find a different donor for Lester. Meanwhile, Caloy's feelings for Sam start to show as she takes care of him at the hospital.
37	37	"Unahan"	November 17, 2020	N/A
38	38	"Pigilan"	November 18, 2020	N/A
39	39	"Operasyon"	November 19, 2020	N/A
40	40	"Engkwento"	November 20, 2020	N/A
41	41	"Hinala"	November 23, 2020	N/A
42	42	"Posibilidad"	November 24, 2020	N/A
43	43	"Wanted"	November 25, 2020	N/A
44	44	"Resulta"	November 26, 2020	N/A
45	45	"Bakas"	November 27, 2020	N/A
46	46	"Duda"	November 30, 2020	N/A
47	47	"Desperado"	December 1, 2020	N/A
48	48	"Puso"	December 2, 2020	N/A
Amalia warns Anton that his plan is seriously flawed. Anton is convinced that the sight of Robbie's corpse will give them a finality, bringing a closure and end to Celine's and Emman's relationship. Amalia doesn't agree, predicting this would intensify their investigation further, and lead them to the family. At the Salvador's, Sam is consoling Emman, who despite the DNA and blood samples retrieved at St. John's confirming Robbie's match with Emman, is clinging to the hope that his son is still alive. They share a moment of intimacy but Emman pulls away, rejecting Sam. Elsewhere, Bernie asks Analyn why she gave his father his whereabouts. She tries to knock some sense to Bernie who is more concerned about Arnold being her boyfriend than his family. Amalia calls Linda to return to work as Lester is back from his surgery. Anton brings Linda and Celine to visit the young boy. The sight of Lester with a new heart is too emotional for Celine. She has a difficult time handing her composure and admits to her mother in anguished words that she feels Robbie's heart beating in Lester. Amalia listens in on their conversation. At the NIA, Marcelo apprises Sam on his investigation, and ties in the swift rise of the Hernandez family fortune from middle class to billionaires within the short time frame from Anton's heart transplant as a young boy to the multi hospital groups they now run. Later, Emman receives a distressing phone call from Sam.
49	49	"Dalamhati"	December 3, 2020	N/A
50	50	"Burol"	December 4, 2020	N/A
51	51	"Suspetsa"	December 7, 2020	N/A
52	52	"Hustisya"	December 8, 2020	N/A
53	53	"Pagbisita"	December 9, 2020	N/A
54	54	"Ebidensya"	December 10, 2020	N/A
55	55	"Proposal"	December 11, 2020	N/A
56	56	"Aminan"	December 14, 2020	N/A
57	57	"Patunayan"	December 15, 2020	N/A
58	58	"Sabwatan"	December 16, 2020	N/A
Unperturbed by Colonel Gabo Manzano's refusal to hire Emman back into the NIA, he similarly shrugs off Major Dante Francisco's belittling potshots and tells him what he thinks of him - a lackey for the syndicate. They almost get into a brawl but Sam and Marcelo stop it. At their team meeting earlier, Manzano reams Sam over her failure to advise her superiors of her interrogation of Drs. Araceli and Amalia. This bothers Sam. At Dr. Araceli's office, Anton and Amalia debrief over Sam's interrogation. Araceli is shaken but is certain she didn't betray herself in any manner. At the NIA, Leo and Colonel Manzano discuss the investigation. He informs the General that he turned down Emman's request to rejoin the NIA. Leo asks him why he did that considering Emman is a top and skilled agent that could help with the investigation. Colonel Manzano is confident with Emman's skills but he is concerned about his close connection to the victim and his desire for revenge. The Colonel brings up the Hernandezes as one of their leads, and his concerned about the close ties between the Hernandezes and the General. The General assures Manzano that no one is above law, friends or family. Soon after, the General calls Emman and asks him to come to his office. At the office, he offers Emman a job.
59	59	"Pagtatapat"	December 17, 2020	N/A
General Chavez offers Emman a job as security officer for the DNS building which Emman accepts. Then he dismisses Nick early because he has a late dinner meeting, but when Nick graciously insists on staying on, his tone changes, curtly and rudely tells him to go home. Nick is bewildered by this side of the General but says nothing. At the hospital, Anton asks Celine for a set date to meet with their wedding planner. Celine tells him she isn't ready to talk about nor plan a wedding, and Anton blows up. Celine won't have any of this behavior so she leaves. Later that evening, Clarissa has her support group up and running. Celine and Emman join the other families of the victims who share their grief and loss. Meanwhile, Amalia blocks off an entire restaurant for the private meeting with their business partner and protector who turns out to be General Leo Chavez. Araceli instructs Amalia to find out what his plans are and obtain an assurance that their family is safe. Leo assures Amalia that he will protect them at all costs. He reveals that his kindness to the Salvadors, Caloy and Sam were all ploys to gain their trust and access to first hand information he knows they keep because of their suspicions of moles in their organization. He assures Amalia that they will be closing the case in no time.
60	60	"Pagdududa"	December 18, 2020	N/A
Caloy admits his true feelings to Sam and she gently turns him down, explaining she would rather keep their friendship as platonic. Caloy is disappointed but is encouraged by Nick and Bernie to persevere. The same evening, at the support group meeting organized by Clarissa for the victims' families, Clarissa shares her own grief when she lost her son to illness. Emman and Celine attend the meeting. While the families attending express their gratitude to Emman, they are hopeful that he will successfully find the perpetrators. Meanwhile, after their dinner meeting, Amalia warns Leo about underestimating Emman. Leo assures her he knows how to play Emman, confident that he will always be one step ahead of him. By gaining Emman's trust, he will thwart all of Emman's next steps effectively deflecting the investigation away from the Hernandezes. At the hospital, Arnold invites Analyn out for dinner after her shift. They have an enjoyable evening nd Arnold admits how at ease he feels with her. Analyn is having fun until she overhears two ladies in the washroom about Arnold being a player. She ends the evening abruptly which confuses Arnold. Later, after the support group dinner, Emman and Celine talk about her feelings about Anton, admitting her confusion and conflicting emotions about moving on with their relationship while she harbors suspicions about their involvement with the syndicate. At that moment, Anton arrives to pick her up and overhears Emman talking about his own suspicions. Furious, Anton swings at Emman. Celine stops the brawl. Emman goes to a beer garden with Sam to cool off, and Caloy joins them. At the Hernandezes home, Celine treats Anton's bruises but Anton is fuming. He admits to Celine that he knows she suspects his family and tells her Emman is feeding all the poison in her mind. Exasperated with Anton, she tells him not to blame Emman. This angers Anton even more. He continues to press Celine. He asks her if she could even consider that his family could be involved, Celine admits it is possible. Outraged, he hits her. Shocked over his violence, she leaves.
61	61	"Huli"	December 21, 2020	N/A
Sam, Caloy and Emman are unwinding in an outdoor beer garden when they spot Franco. They capture him and bring him into an abandoned home where they torture him for information. Despite the beatings Emman inflicts on him, Franco is silent. At the NIA, Sam updates the team but does not tell them about Franco. Agent Marcelo cautions Sam about violating protocols, but Sam is more concerned about losing another witness to the hands of the moles inside the NIA. She is hoping Emman will be able to get Franco to talk. At the Delgado's home, Linda is horrified that Anton hit Celine, but rationalizes his action because of his anger and hurt over Celine's suspicions regarding his family. Celine stands her ground that Anton has no right to raise his hand against her. At the Hernandezes, Amalia and Anton are fighting over Anton's obsession for Celine when Araceli comes in and demands a halt to the name blaming. At the Chavezes, Clarissa and Leo are fighting as Clarissa suspects her husband is preoccupied once again over another woman.
62	62	"Halaga"	December 22, 2020	N/A
Caloy tries to calm Emman and warns him to go easy on Franco, reminding him that if he kills him, they will not obtain any information on the syndicate leadership. Franco tries to escape but is captured by Sam, who turns him into custody. Arnold attends his first training day at the NIA. At the Hernandez home, Anton, Araceli and Amalia discuss their problem with Arnold's disobedience. Amalia reminds Anton of his need for Arnold and it is his responsibility to keep his brother safe. Araceli admits he has become important to her, but Arnold's value for Anton is paramount. At the Chavez home, Clarissa and Anton make up over last night's scandal at the restaurant. Leo assures Clarissa that he loves her very much and is loyal to her. At the Hernandezes, Amalia feigns sadness that Celine suspects their involvement with the syndicate. Linda falls for her act and sympathizes with Amelita, who arranges a family meeting. At the meeting, Anton and Araceli pacifies an emotional Linda with promises that Anton will never hurt her daughter again. At the hospital, Celine hands in her resignation. Anton and Amalia try to ask her to reconsider but Celine refuses to discuss it, which provokes Anton again to make a scene in front of numerous hospital staff. Amelia exhorts her mother to rein in her brother and stop his obsession for Celine but Araceli sympathizes with Anton's feelings, which leads to another row between mother and daughter. Back at the NIA interrogation room, Franco refuses to speak. Emman and Caloy are warned of illegal detention when they captured and tortured Franco instead of turning him in.
63	63	"Kondisyon"	December 23, 2020	N/A
At NIA, Sam senses something off with Franco's interrogation, she suspects a connection between the suspect and Dante. Franco agrees to confess under the condition he receives a reduced sentence and is placed under the Witness Protection Program. The other condition is that his confession be held at a public press conference. Franco arrives flanked by General Chavez and Colonel Manzano. He publicly admits his key role within the syndicate. Franco confesses his position as main point person leading and executing hundreds of child abductions for the purposes of child trafficking for the organ donor black market. He admits that his team provides the operation's security and logistics, transports child donors to the locations where the organs are harvested, protects the farms where the children are housed. He names all his accomplices who are all dead. He reports directly to Dr. Josephine Gomez, the boss and mastermind of the entire syndicate. Since Dr. Gomez disappeared or went into hiding, the entire operations ceased with the deaths of his accomplices. All the children that he abducted have all been harvested for Dr. Gomez' clients. The Hernandezes are relieved. Flashback reveals Leo and Amalia hatch the plan on how to take the heat away from the Hernandez. Leo asked Amalia to find a scapegoat to take full blame and a fall guy to point that person out. Anton contacts Franco, pays him with a handsome amount of money and promises to get him out with the assurance of the General's protection. The scapegoat is Dr. Gomez who according to authorities is still subject of a nationwide manhunt. Leo tells Amalia that Dr. Gomez' body should not be discovered. Franco later purposely gets caught by Emman so he can be brought to NIA for his confession. As Franco is being led out of NIA, he is confronted by the families of the victims including Emman and Celine. Though the Hernandezes feel they are off the hook, Amalia still has concerns about the tenacity and determination of Celine and Emman to get to the bottom of it all, and again pushes for Anton and her mother to sever ties with Celine and Linda. After the press conference, Leo meets with the families of the victims who demand justice for all the members of the syndicate, including searching and capturing Dr. Gomez. Celine presses the General on who killed her son, to which he replies they do not know who harvested his organs at St. John's, and all the syndicate members are dead.
64	64	"Paniniwala"	December 24, 2020	N/A
After Franco's public press conference where he admits to a decade long child trafficking operations for the syndicate, naming all his accomplices, pointing to Dr. Gomez as the sole mastermind, Emman and Celine are not buying it, suspecting a cover up for the real mastermind. They still believe Dr. Araceli is the mastermind on the circumstantial evidence they gathered such as the cell phone number at Dr Araceli's room was among the list of numbers retrieved from St. John, the blood on the doctor's right shoulder. Emman and Celine get into an altercation outside the hospital and this time Celine sticks up for Emman, sending Anton away. At the Hernandez' home, both doctors fuss over a severely bruised Anton. His mother worries about the effect of stress on his heart. His sister is concerned by the negative perception his fight with Emman creates, which she feels projects guilt. His mother cautions him that his heart could fail, to which Anton nonchalantly reminds them of their reserve spare. At that moment, Arnold comes in and asks his mom about Dr. Gomez and she responds that she doesn't know her. Arnold is surprised because Dr. Gomez is a familiar face and his mother's friend, often seeing his mother chatting with her at the hospital. He later confronts his mother but she just blows it away. A flashback reveals Araceli ruthlessly arranging for Franco to kill Dr. Gomez, Araceli is coldbloodedly pacifying a panicked doctor to wait for the help she is sending, just before she is executed by Franco. Meanwhile, Celine ponders over her two failed relationships, while her mother Linda tries to persuade her not to listen to Emman and encourages Celine to give Anton a second chance. Despite her mother's advice, Celine remains bent on finding the truth. That evening she and Emman talk about how they can tie Dr. Araceli to the syndicate. Emman points out the gunshot wound is crucial. At the NIA office, the team discuss finding Dr. Gomez'body and the circumstances surrounding Dr. Gomez' corpse. Dante suggests she committed suicide, but Sam does not agree. The bullet's trajectory supports Sam's argument. Later, Anton receives investigation updates from Dante, warning him to accelerate closing the case and to impede Sam and Emman's efforts to introduce any more information that would keep the case open. Dante assures Anton that the concluding report will be ruled as a suicide. Anton waits for Celine at her new place of employment and begs for her forgiveness, promising to apologise to and make amends with Emman and swears he will never lay a hand on her again.
65	65	"Pasabog"	December 25, 2020	N/A
Celine and Anton appears to have patched things up, Anton promising he would never raise his hand against Celine again. Linda is most enthusiastic over their reconciliation, much to Amalia's irritation. They visit Lester, and later Celine apologizes to the family for doubting them. Meanwhile, Sam discusses Dr. Gomez' ballistic and forensic reports with Emman and Caloy, pointing out the only gunshot wound Dr. Gomez suffered was the head wound, not a shoulder wound. This reinforces Emman's suspicion that it wasn't Dr. Gomez he shot at St. John. At the Hernandezes, Dr. Araceli admonishes her son for raising his hand on his fiancé and tells him it is unacceptable behavior. They discuss wedding dates, to which Celine reluctantly acquiesces but Linda wholeheartedly supports. At the hospital, Arnold spots Analyn and Bernie quarreling. He follows them and overhears Bernie warn Analyn that the Hernadezes are suspects in the organ traffic syndicate investigation. At his new job as NIA security officer, Leo speaks to Emman and advises him that the case is closed on the basis of Franco's confession pointing to Dr. Gomez as sole mastermind. He gently tries to convince him to move on. At the Hernandezes, Dr. Araceli gets ready for an engagement. Celine enters her room to apologize once again for her doubts. Dr. Araceli assures her she has forgiven her and only asks for Celine to make Anton happy. As Celine helps fasten her dress, she sees the gunshot wound but pretends she does not notice it. Later, back at their office, Drs. Araceli and Amalia celebrate Leo's confirmation that the Organ Traffic Syndicate case is closed. They congratulate themselves for successfully disposing all evidence implicating them, and Araceli looks forward to a vacation and Anton's wedding. Amalia is not happy about the wedding but Araceli is convinced Celine no longer doubts them. Back at the Salvadors, Celine phones Emman about her discovery of Dr. Araceli's shoulder wound.
66	66	"Palaisipan"	December 28, 2020	N/A
Celine quickly apprises Emman of her discovery of Dr. Araceli's gunshot wound, though Sam and Emman say it is circumstantial and unless forensics and the ballistics prove otherwise, insufficient to prove that she was the Doctor whom Emman shot during the raid at St. John's Hospital. They need more evidence to arrest or bring them in for questioning. Sam and Emman believe the evidence they need is in the hospital. Devising a plan to further investigate the restricted facility Caloy stumbled into when he tried to escape custody a few weeks ago, the group decide Celine and Caloy do the exploring. Since Celine is a nurse at the hospital, she can move about unnoticed, while Caloy retraces his steps with her. Meanwhile, to make amends with her daughter after their row, Dr. Araceli advises her daughter that she would be resigning and turning over the reins to Dr. Amalia. Over dinner with Leo, Amelia relays her pleasure over her mother's decision. As they discuss the ongoing investigation, Clarissa barges in demanding an explanation over the meeting's secrecy. Meanwhile, at the Hernandezes, Arnold pursues his own investigation of his mother. Unable to get Bernie's words out of his mind, and confused over his mother's denial of her Dr. Gomez relationship, Arnold discovers he is adopted, when he sees an old newspaper article of his mother and Dr. Gomez together, dated barely a month before he was born. The photograph shows a very unpregnant and slim Dr. Araceli. Confronting his mother, she breaks down and admits the truth of his adoption. She begs him to believe that she loves him as if he were her biological son. Anton overhears their conversation and is bothered by his mother's emotional reaction. At the end of her shift Celine suffers conflicting emotions as she recalls the gunshot wound she saw in her future mother in law's shoulder. She does not think it is a coincidence, is convinced of Dr. Araceli's guilt but hopes Anton is not involved.
67	67	"Alibi"	December 29, 2020	N/A
After confronting her husband and her best friend at the restaurant together, Clarissa believes Amelia's explanation behind their secret meeting is Leo planning for a surprise birthday for her. Later, grateful to Amelia for covering, Leo reiterates his promise to protect the Hernandez' organ trafficking operations. Meanwhile, Arnold confides to Linda about the rumor he heard from Bernie about his family. At the Salvadors, Caloy describes restricted area in the hospital he stumbled into when he was caught trying to escape a few weeks ago. Emman wants to accompany Celine and Caloy to check out the area but Sam believes his popularity will make it difficult for them to go about unrecognized. Linda confronts the Salvador family warning them about spreading lies about the Hernandezes, leading to another fight between Celine and her mother. Arnold confronts his mother with the discovery of his adoption. Amalia breaks down and professes her love for Arnold is equal to the love for Amelia and Anton. She convenes a family meeting and her children reiterate their mother's words. Privately, Anton asks his mother if she really cares that much for Arnold, revealing their diabolical plan for Arnold, whose heart is designated to be Anton's reserve spare, just in case Anton's heart gives way.
68	68	"Imbestiga"	December 30, 2020	N/A
Arnold believes his mother's explanation about Dr. Gomez. Touched by his mother's emotional profession of her love, and the worry he causes, he decides to forego his dream of becoming an NIA agent and join his family's hospital business. Meanwhile, Celine and Caloy is inside the hospital searching for the restricted facility. Anton arrives and spots Emman and Sam outside the hospital grounds. They tell him they are waiting for Caloy who has an appointment with Dr. Montecillo to look at his injured arm. As he promised Celine, he makes amends with Emman. At the general's home, Leo overhears Clarissa and Nick discussing the previous night's event at the restaurant. Leo sternly rebukes Nick about overstepping his boundaries and warns him not to report his whereabouts to Clarissa. Nick is clearly bothered by his reaction but says nothing.
69	69	"Bistado"	December 31, 2020	N/A
Amelia concludes the auction of their farm's latest organ harvest. All its current children residents have sponsors, and mother and daughter discuss the increased demands for more children. Meanwhile, suspicious over Emman and Sam's presence in the hospital, Anton checks on Caloy's condition, and learns the Dr. did not conduct clinics that day. He quickly checks his security monitor and sees Celine and Caloy heading down the stairwell to the secret facility. He alerts Amelia who quickly has her staff delete all the data in the computers. Amelia sends Enrico Gardoze, her head security officer, to confront Celine outside the locked door. Celine claims she lost her way. At the NIA, Colonel Manzano continues to interrogate Franco and threatens arraignment. This prompts Franco to warn Major Dante Francisco, the Hernandez' mole in the NIA, that he would bring everyone down if the General does not keep his word. Outside the hospital, Caloy and Celine debrief Sam and Emman, who suspect Amelia may already have cleaned the evidence. Anton invites Celine for dinner, confirming his suspicions that Celine is working with Emman to investigate his family's connection to the syndicate. Anton's plans is unknown.
70	70	"Arestado"	January 1, 2021	N/A
Later that evening, Emman and Caloy ambush Gardoze as he leaves the hospital. They trick Gardoze to provide information on the pretext that they are holding his family captive. Gardoze brings them to the restricted facility at the hospital but by this time, all the files are deleted. Meanwhile, not aware of his circumstances, Dr. Araceli contacts Gardoze advising him that she transferred funds to his account and expects him to tidy up the facility to wipe away any incriminating information about the organ trafficking. Emman records the conversation between Dr. Araceli and Gardoze. Gardoze brings them to Joan Salidad, the facilities' head nurse, who advises Gardoze that she has cleaned all the files from the hospital server at the secret office, and transferred them all to Dr. Araceli's computer. When she realizes that Emman and Caloy were there, she tries to run away. A scuffle ensues as Gardoze attempts to gain the upper hand but both Gardoze and Joan are shot. Back at the NIA, Dante advises Franco that they plan to bust him out from custody on their way to his arraignment at City Jail. At the NIA, with enough evidence to prove Dr. Araceli's role as mastermind of the organ trafficking operations, Sam reports these to Col. Manzano. The Colonel and his team come to the Hernandez residence, serving Dr. Araceli a warrant for her arrest, as well as a subpoena for Anton, Amelia and Arnold for questioning.
71	71	"Interogasyon"	January 4, 2021	N/A
Dr. Araceli is arrested for multiple counts of murder, kidnapping, illegal detention of children and organ trafficking. The entire Hernandez family is brought in to NIA Headquarters for questioning. The Salvadors are allowed to participate in the interrogation, and it becomes heated when the evidence presented makes it difficult for Dr. Araceli to refute. The Hernandez lawyer attempts to invalidate the evidence on circumstantial and privacy technicalities. The lawyer claims that Emman's voice recorder of her call to Gardoze last night, and Nurse Joan's documents retrieved from her home proving bank transactions as pay offs for illegal services, were retrieved and recorded illegally. Meanwhile, shocked over the latest developments about the family she trusted and admired, Linda returns to Dr. Araceli's room to retrieve the doctor's laptop and submits the equipment to NIA. Knowing that the entire database is in the equipment Dr. Araceli breaks into a confession. Meanwhile, Leo promises Amalia that he will get rid of Franco, the only witness alive and held captive, who could spill the beans on the entire syndicate. Meanwhile, the news reports all about Dr. Araceli's arrest, that the entire Hernandez family may be involved, as well as possible protection from a powerful figure in law enforcement. Analyn apologizes to Bernie and admits he was right about the family. Leo remains duplicitous, he promises Nick that his long time friendship with the Hernandezes will not influence the judicial process to obtain justice for Robbie. Leo is aware that his reputation is at stake because of this relationship and his quick move to close the case. The true syndicate leadership is about to be exposed. The one person who can bring all of them down is Franco.
72	72	"Patawad"	January 5, 2021	N/A
Dr. Araceli gives a full confession claiming to be the only person in her family involved with the syndicate, shielding Amalia and Anton of any knowledge of her operations. She describes her rise within the organization, from the first time when she agreed to assist the syndicate and become their cardiac transplant physician in exchange for a heart donor for her son, to eventually taking over and running its organization today. She justifies her action as simply a mother protecting her children, and her hospital's abilities to help others. Celine is appalled at her demonic reasoning and demands to know how Robbie was murdered. Dr. Araceli denies she used Robbie's heart for Lester. Exhausted by the grilling interview, Dr. Araceli collapses and is rushed to the hospital. Later at Celine's home, Linda apologizes to her daughter for doubting her and pushing her towards Anton. She also apologizes to Emman for the many cruel words she hurled at him in the past. Unnerved by Araceli's statement that Robbie was not the heart donor for Lester, Celine wants to investigate, sparking hope that Robbie may still be alive. Although Franco admits he brought Robbie to St. John's, the unexpected raid may have interrupted the transplant. At the A. Hernandez hospital, Araceli is confined under NIA security. Amalia and Anton visit, assuring their mother of a vigorous defense by her lawyers. Araceli tells Anton that she shielded him especially for Celine because she wants him to be happy as she knows he is happiest with her.
73	73	"Pagbagsak"	January 6, 2021	N/A
Dr. Araceli's confession is plastered all over the news. Her alleged unconscious condition delays her arraignment. Leo advises Amalia to keep her there for as long as possible. Because of the gravity of her confession, her children remain under a cloud of suspicion but are not charged, further angering the public. Demonstrations outside DNS compound and the NIA office grow each day that their arrest and Araceli's arraignment is delayed. At the hospital, Amalia urges Leo to do something, she needs Franco released so he can secure the farm and its residents. Even as several business partners withdraw their support, she is not shutting down the business. Her priority is to deliver her outstanding commitments to her clients. Leo tells her they will be executing the plan to arrange for Franco's escape while transporting him to City Jail. At NIA, Col. Manzano views the CCTV footage and notices the absence of audio footage while Dante interrogates Franco. Outside the building, the media surrounds Leo demanding answers about the swift turn of events, from a closed case with Dr. Gomez as the leader, to Dr. Araceli's confession. They allege a cover up because of Leo's close ties with the Hernandezes. Leo is offended at the insult on his integrity and promises he will get answers soon. Meanwhile at the hospital, Celine tries to see Dr. Araceli but is told that she is still unconscious. Amalia comes out to speak with Celine and assures her that Lester's transplant was done legally, that her mother loved Robbie and would never have allowed it. Celine does not believe any of it because it was Robbie's blood and DNA at St. John's, and it was Dr. Araceli who was shot while trying to escape during the raid. She keeps this information to herself so as not to jeopardize the case. Anton arrives shortly and pleads with Celine to believe that he is not involved. She breaks her engagement to him and tells him she no long recognizes the family that she knew and loved.
74	74	"Kutob"	January 7, 2021	N/A
Anton persists with his pursuit to regain Celine's trust. She asks him for the truth and the chance to speak with his mother. Anton admits he knew what his mother did but swears Lester's heart was procured and transplanted by legal means. Inside Araceli's hospital room where she is confined, Amalia confides to her mother that Leo and her are planning her mother's escape. Araceli asks her not to, but Amalia is set on doing it. Meanwhile at the NIA, Colonel Manzano prepares to transport Franco to the City Jail. He advises Franco that the plea bargain they agreed to is off the table because Franco lied in his statement when he failed to identify Dr. Araceli, to which Franco sneers seemingly uncaring of his fate. As they discuss their next step, Celine wants to focus on Lester's donor. She tells Emman about Anton's promise to arrange for an opportunity to speak with his mother. They discuss their suspicions about General Chavez, Dante Francisco and Colonel Manzano. She also tells Emman that she has broken off her engagement with Anton. At the NIA compound, Sam learns that Franco is being transported to City Jail. She notices the lack of strict security protocol, so she follows them. She alerts Emman and gives him their exact location.
75	75	"Ambush"	January 8, 2021	N/A
Amalia is angry and frustrated over her two brothers' lack of support for their mother and the criminal charges she faces. Anton asks her to help provide false documentation that he could present Celine to prove that Lester's heart isn't Robbie's. Amalia is furious that his priority is Celine rather than their family's situation. Arnold is shocked into withdrawing from his mother and Amalia calls him an ingrate. Meanwhile, Emman and Sam catch up to Dante, and witness him free Franco and prepare to stage the scene of a fake ambush. Despite the surprise seeing Sam and Emman, Franco and Dante disarm Emman and Sam, who are outnumbered, and is about to execute them, when Colonel Manzano arrives killing Dante and the other escorts. Franco is able to escape. He meets up with Amalia, and shortly after is joined by Leo and Anton, as they discuss Araceli's escape. Leo tells Araceli that with major dante's death, they lost their only spy remaining at the NIA. Araceli instructs Franco to expand their force, increase their weapons. Meanwhile back at the NIA for a debrief, the colonel, Sam and Emman agree to work together to topple the syndicate. They shake hands and agree to trust each other.
76	76	"Pagtatalo"	January 11, 2021	N/A
Caloy is heartbroken over his inability to win Sam who is clearly still very much in love with Emman. He pleads with Emman to get together with Celine. At the Hernandez home, a more appeased Amalia thanks Anton for agreeing to help their mother escape. She agrees to give Celine the proof that Robbie's heart isn't in Lester. In their arrogance, the two siblings believe that giving Celine this false information would stop her from investigating further. Anton tells Celine that Amalia will request for her son's donor identity but admits that due to privacy laws, it will take some time. He appeals to Celine to give him another chance when he brings the information. Celine appears to soften. Emman witnesses the silent exchange. He urgently tells Celine not to listen to Anton and to stop seeing him. Emman shows Celine the documentation on the NIA autopsy, DNA and blood results that prove without a doubt that Robbie is the body they buried. Celine tells Emman she shares his suspicions of the family's involvement but the forensics and autopsy reports are not absolute proof of their son's whereabouts. Angry that Emman would not hold on to her hopes, she lashes out at Emman and asks him to leave. At Analyn's, another Salvador is battling an Hernandez. Bernie finds Arnold with Analyn who took him to her house overnight when she found him in the bar totally wasted with alcohol. Analyn tells Bernie she doesn't believe he is involved with the syndicate. At the NIA, Colonel Manzano promotes Sam Agoncillo as team leader to replace Captain Francisco. Later, General Chavez calls him to his office and castigates him for his failure to secure Franco Vergara, and failure to identify Capt. Francisco as a traitor operating under his nose. Colonel Manzano tells him he won't let it happen again and is intensifying their investigations, including some his plans to interview Anton and Amalia. In the course of their discussion, General Chavez takes offense by Manzano's referring to the close relationship between Clarissa and Amalia. Colonel Manzano is puzzled.
77	77	"Paliwanag"	January 12, 2021	N/A
Colonel Gabriel Manzano authorizes Dr. Araceli's transfer to the NIA Holding facility instead of City Jail, to wait out her arraignment and prevent any escape attempt. Amalia wants Leo to use his men to distract the transfer and to coordinate with Franco to execute her escape. This worries the General who is currently struggling to change the public's perception about him, as protector of the Hernandez's because of their close ties. Hoping to delay the escape plan, he warns Amalia that the intense public scrutiny would trigger further investigation if they lose custody of Araceli, creating a domino effect with a trail leading to them. Not convinced, and concerned over the fact that they no longer have a mole inside the NIA to protect their mother, Amalia and Anton are anxious to take their mother out of the country and avoid jail. Before her transfer, Nick alerts Emman that the General is on his way to interview and interrogate Araceli. Emman finds it suspicious considering the General's close ties with the Hernandezes would make it unethical and outside protocol. Meanwhile, Celine forces her way into Araceli's suite and confronts Araceli who denies she was even aware that Robbie was in the hands of the syndicate. Amalia swears that Lester's heart comes from another donor and she can prove it. Linda emotionally confronts Araceli, the woman who she looked up to as her mother figure for most of her adult life. Araceli coldly responds with an apology for disappointing her. Colonel Manzano and his men arrive to escort Dr. Araceli to NIA.
78	78	"Paglipat"	January 13, 2021	N/A
Araceli faces a mob of angry people as she is escorted out of the hospital. While Araceli is on route to the NIA holding facility, Franco and his men are on their way as well, not to rescue Araceli. They abduct a young boy outside his driveway waiting for his ride to school. Meanwhile, at the hospital, Amalia tells Celine she is ready to give her the proof she wants: all the confidential paperwork that proves Lester's heart belonged to another donor with the similar golden blood type. At the NIA facility, General Chavez interviews Araceli and expresses his anger and disappointment with Araceli. He presses her to name her accomplices. Araceli agrees to name them but in a public press conference.
79	79	"Sangkot"	January 14, 2021	N/A
Clarissa's birthday party is underway and Amalia attends. Her presence results to much gossip and speculation among the guests. Earlier, Amalia receives Franco's update of their latest abducted victim, safely processed at the farm. Amalia instructs Franco to safeguard the child who is more valuable to her clients because of the rarity of the child's blood and genetic make up. Elsewhere, Celine obtains documents from Amalia and promptly brings it to Emman who is skeptical about the validity of the papers. He scolds her for contuing to believe Anton, whom he is convinced, is fanning Celine's hope that her son is still alive somewhere, and using this to keep her by his side. Celine is angry with Emman for refusing to believe or hold on to the hope that their son might be alive. Back to Clarissa's birthday, Leo tells Amalia that her mother is planning to speak publicly about the syndicate. Amalia is unaware of her mother's plan, raising Leo's concern that Araceli will rat out on him. Amalia assures him that she won't.
80	80	"Karapatan"	January 15, 2021	N/A
In a complete about-face, Linda advises her daughter to stay away from Anton and not listen to his lies. Instead, she counsels Celine to trust in Emman because he truly loves her. She reminds Celine that she didn't give him a chance and abandoned him when he was jailed. Meanwhile at Clarissa's party, a gatecrasher and mother of a victim abducted and killed by the syndicate, confronts the General and Amalia. After the gatecrasher is escorted out, one of the guests bluntly asks Leo if he is indeed protecting the syndicate and the Hernandez family. This causes Leo to lose his temper and is restrained from punching the guest. Back at the NIA facility, Araceli is being advised by her lawyer to wait for the court hearing where he can prove her confession was made under duress. He assures her that much of the evidence presented would be dismissed since they were obtained without a court order. He advises her against a press conference. But determined to take full and sole responsibility of the crimes charged against her case to shield her children, Araceli asks her lawyer to do something for her. Unfortunately, the lawyer asks Agent Ramirez to mute the CCTV audio calling on her right to privacy. Meanwhile, Celine is pondering her mother's words, and as she looks back at Emman's professions of love for her, she decides to speak with him and give him a chance. At Emman's place, Sam pours out her love for Emman and once again begs him to give their previous relationship a chance. Emman tries to ease her off gently but Sam persists and kisses him. It is at this moment that Celine finds them. Disappointed and also furious, she hastens to leave but emman goes after her. She tells him she understands why he is ready to move on, especially about Robbie's fate, because he has found happiness and love with Sam. Seeing Celine refusing to listen to Emman's explanation, Sam berates Celine claiming she has no right to be angry because she left him a long time ago while Sam stayed with him. Celine is shocked that they kept the relationship from her. She leaves in a huff.
81	81	"Banta"	January 18, 2021	N/A
Celine is devastated by her discovery that Emman and Sam were lovers and didn't tell her. Unwilling to listen to Emman, he believes his chances for winning Celine back is now impossible, especially since she witnessed them kissing. Emman's attempts to explain the context of that intimate moment are rebuffed. The next morning, Sam rationalizes that her actions last night are justified and the best opportuned time to drive Celine away. At the Salvadors' home, Bernie shows Emman and Nick the video of Leo's altercation at Clarissa's party which has gone viral in social media. Nick updates Emman of his observations of Leo, and he thinks something is not right with the man. Emman advises more caution around the General. At the General's home while Clarissa chatters mindlessly about the Hernandez' predicament, she sees the viral video showing an out-of-control General Leo Chavez. Leo is clearly disturbed by the implications of the video. The repercussions of Araceli's confession and the viral video affects many people associated with the Hernandez family. At a club, Arnold is mocked and taunted as a murderer and he promptly gets into a brawl and is thrown out. The next morning, as Amalia prepares to go to work, Celine arrives to see her. Clearly irritated with Celine, Amalia loses her normally calm demeanor that masks her evil character. Celine asks Amalia for her approval for a Cardiac Catheterization, a minor procedure to compare DNA heart samples between Emman and Lester. She tells Amalia that if it doesn't match, she will never doubt them again. Amalia loses her temper and Anton arrives in time to stop them.
82	82	"Hiling"	January 19, 2021	N/A
Anton pleads with Celine to give his sister time, promising to get her to agree to obtaining a DNA sample from Lester's heart. At the NIA, Araceli's children visit with her before is transported to the DNS press conference. Arnold apologizes to his mother for not being there for her, to which Araceli responds asking him to remain her good son - a foreshadowing that remains unnoticed by the NIA monitoring their conversation. When Araceli confers the "good son" label on Arnold, she implies that he is the only one of her three children not involved in the odious family business. Anton and Amalia try to convince their mother to fight the charges, but their mother refuses, instead calling upon her children to take care of each other. Elsewhere, Nestor, Amalia's ex-husband, is released from prison, ready to exact revenge. Meanwhile, at the Delgados, Celine asks her mother for help with her plan to trick the Hernandez siblings. She will pretend to get back with Anton to win back the Hernandez' trust so she can find the truth of Robbie's fate. Linda tells her it is dangerous, pleading her to leave it with Emman and the NIA. Celine, however, is adamant. Linda agrees to help her daughter and later returns to the Hernandez home to resume her nursing duties for Lester. Elsewhere, on route to the DNS press conference, Anton and Amelia are anxious over which syndicate partner their mother will name. At the DNS during the General's morning briefing with his secretary, Nick witnesses once again Leo explode at his aide. Nick tells Emman who is concerned Leo's frequent outbursts may be a sign of guilt of his involvement with the syndicate. He urges his father to resign from the General's employ, but Nick believes he will be able to gather good Intel by staying on. While nick and emman talk, the General is in his office, finalizing a something in his laptop. Outside DNS, it is not only the General and the Hernandez siblings who are jumpy, the entire security task force are on high alert, worried the syndicate would use the press conference as a distraction to facilitate Araceli's escape. While Sam and Agent Marcelo are conversing, another NIA agent is seen surreptitiously observing them closely. Meanwhile, at the DNS, an unidentified individual is removing a hand gun hidden behind a toilet. As Araceli comes down the stairs surrounded by Colonel Manzano and his team in a tightly guarded formation, General Chavez once again reminds her to give justice to her victims by telling the truth. He takes over Colonel Manzano and accompanies her to meet the press. The General directs Amalia and Anton to remain in the holding area to avoid the press. At this moment, the unidentified person, this time wearing a press staff badge, joins a group of media gathered, posing as a photographer. The media watch and film Araceli saying goodbye to her children. Members of the various media networks are already inside the press room waiting for Araceli, her lawyer and the General to come in.
83	83	"Tapusin"	January 20, 2021	N/A
Tragedy unfolds at the press conference when an unidentified gunman pretending to be a photographer shoots Araceli just moments before she is about to name her syndicate partners. Earlier, she rationalizes her twisted motivation as actions for the greater good, that the children killed for organ harvesting have worthless parents, and losing their lives to the syndicate actually contribute to extending and saving lives of many others. She denies any knowledge of what happened to Robbie, and once again absolves her children's involvement. Araceli dies instantly, shocking everyone present. Amalia and Anton who were in the holding room are stunned. Emman almost catches the gunman by the road, but an approaching van runs him down from behind, picking up the gunman. Emman suffers a concussion and contusions and is hospitalized. The Hernandez children grieve over the lifeless body of Araceli at the funeral morgue, vowing to find the killer. As Amalia prepares her mother's dress, Linda comes to offer her assistance. Despite the loss of her grandson to the syndicate, Linda is distraught over Araceli's demise, whom she has looked to as her second mother. Amalia and Linda share their grief. At the DNS, Leo and Colonel Manzano watch the news replays of the shooting. He orders a complete investigation as Gabo tells him they will do a thorough review of all the CCTV tapes in the building, and conduct a nationwide manhunt for the gunman.
84	84	"Pagdamay"	January 21, 2021	N/A
Sam and her NIA team review the CCTV footages, struggling to decipher the getaway van's license plate. Meanwhile, at the funeral chapel where Araceli lies in state for viewing, Amalia, wracked with grief, calls Leo and blames him for changing the carefully coordinated plans for her mother's escape. She accuses him of aborting them to clear his own name. Leo adamantly insists that her mother's determination for a public confession, forced him to abort their escape plans for her. He tells Amalia that her mother's statements before she was shot, and the lack of evidence, clears all of them of any involvement. Furious and distraught, Amalia wants the identity of the persons behind her murder. The families of the syndicate's victims as well as the media gather outside. They rush up to Arnold when he arrives, pressing him with questions. Anton and Amalia come out, asking them to stop the intrusion to allow them to grieve. Once again, a distraught Amalia appeals for their compassion, she tells them they lost a mother who only showed them love, never the evil that she confessed to. Inside, Anton voices his concerns that they would be their syndicate partners’ next target. Amelita is confident that Leo's statement about their innocence will calm the syndicate. The news headlines the next day reiterate the Hernandez siblings’ innocence. Watching the drama on the TV news from his hospital bed, Emman is not fooled, firm in his belief that the truth will come out sooner or later. Meanwhile, at the DNS, Leo is seen reviewing all the CCTV footage and seems satisfied with what he sees. A sinister smile appears on his face. His aide comes in to advise him that the Chief of Staff is summoning him to his office. General Ronquillo gives Leo a harsh warning for losing the syndicate mastermind and allowing the gunman to escape. He expects investigative results and the case's resolution with all the syndicate members flushed out as soon as possible. At the funeral chapel, Celine pays her respect but receives a chilly and no response from Amalia. Despite Celine's sympathy, Anton is devastated and vows to avenge his mother's murder.
85	85	"Simpatya"	January 22, 2021	N/A
Amalia asks Linda to stay with Lester while she prepares to return to Lester to break the news to him of his grandmother's death. Anton asks her once again to concede to Celine's request for Dna sample from her son's heart, which she rejects. At the hospital, Sam updates Emman, she finds it strange that they have no leads, no witnesses willing to testify. At the funeral, the General and Clarissa visit. Privately, Leo promises he will catch the murderer. Unknown to them, Nestor, Amalia's ex husband is snooping the place planning something to get his revenge. At the Hernandez home, Amalia breaks the news to Lester who is heartbroken. Celine proceeds with her secret plan to infiltrate the Hernandez' world once again to gain information on Robbie. She is mocked and spurned by the media and the victims. For easier access to information, she rejoins the nursing staff at Hernandez hospital. She also keeps her true plans from Emman, who is convinced she has written him off.
86	86	"Harapan"	January 25, 2021	N/A
The funeral concludes with emotional eulogies from Anton and Amalia, both vowing to carry on their mother's hospital legacy, secretly promising to find her killer. After the funeral, the General hurries to the DNS Conference Room for updates on the Hernandez investigation. He berates Nick who forgets to bring a black valise. Rushing to retrieve the bag, he accidentally spills its contents, and notices a small envelope marked DNA Solutions. Later, the General apologizes for his earlier behavior. With nothing much gained in their investigation, Colonel Manzano receives scathing words from Leo who presses for names. Meanwhile, Emman presses Sam to place Anton and his siblings under surveillance on the possibility hey may be the next victims by the syndicate. Emman watches outside Celine's home as Anton comes over to visit her.
87	87	"Bisita"	January 26, 2021	N/A
Sam and Marcelo discuss the challenges of their investigation and lack of solid leads. Sam instructs Marcelo to assign surveillance teams for Anton and Araceli. Despite their clearance by the General, Emman still believes them to be persons of interest thus asks Sam to put a tail on each of them. Meanwhile, Celine invites Anton inside her home. When Amalia agrees to the DNA extraction on Lester, Anton asks Celine if she suspects them with tampering with the DNA results. Celine says she trusts Anton. He professes his hopes of getting back together. Celine pretends she still loves him. At the Hernandez home, Amalia gets a call from Franco who expresses his condolences and asks for additional funds for the farm, their ammunition and pay increases for his men. Amalia promises to send the funds. Shortly after, her ex-husband, Nestor, sneaks into Lester's room. Amalia blurts out his name. Lester recalls his mother naming his father as Nestor. He asks the intruder if he is his father. At the DNS, the General calls Franco, berating him for his sloppy work.
88	88	"Pagkakamali"	January 27, 2021	N/A
Nestor makes clear to Amalia that he wants 20 million pesos for his silence about Lester's paternity. Linda is surprised to see Nestor return, as she runs into their conversation. Lester admires her loyalty to the family but cryptically cautions her to be careful. After Nestor leaves, Amalia explains to the confused Lester that the man was merely his father's namesake and a business associate. Lester voices his apprehension and dislike for the man who came into his room. Meanwhile, Anton is at Celine's house, pretending to miss Robbie, and asks if he could sleepover. He tells Celine that he believes Robbie is still alive. On the other hand, Emman is at Sam's apartment, seeking consolation over his heartbreak after seeing Anton sleep over at Celine's. Emman and Sam get drunk, become intimate and spends the night with her. The next day at the NIA, more dead ends. Marcelo gets the reports that fingerprints found in the assassin's gun do not match the nationwide database. General Chavez is incensed over the case's stagnation, giving Colonel Manzano one week to find solid leads or the case transfer to another agency.
89	89	"Manipula"	January 28, 2021	N/A
Caloy warns Emman that resuming a relationship with Sam on the rebound will only hurt her. Sam is undoubtedly happy over the turn of events in her love life. Meanwhile she alerts Emman about the General's ultimatum of one week to get solid leads or he transfers the case to another agency. Emman brings his suspicions to General Chavez, that there appears to be a high government official protecting the syndicate, who is able to manipulate the investigation and throw away their strong leads. Meanwhile at the Delgados, Linda grows increasingly concerned about Celine's ongoing pretense to reconnect with Anton. Linda encourages her to talk to Emman but Celine is convinced that Emman has moved on with Sam and prefers to have their own separate lives. At the Hernandezes, Anton asks Amalia about Nestor. Amalia assures him that she can handle him. She decides not to pay him the 20 million pesos. Nestor is furious and drives off angry. Later that afternoon, Araceli's lawyer, Atty. Rabago, sends the General a video of her last recorded request which was conducted with her lawyer at the NIA interview room before the press conference. The video reveals to be Araceli's true confession and is addressed to Leo. In her statement, she says she is sacrificing her life to save her children from being implicated, to allow the continued operations of the syndicate and warns Leo that if he doesn't follow her last request to arrange to be killed, this video will expose the General's connection and support of the syndicate. Flashback scenes reveal the General handing Franco Vergara a bagful of money to arrange for the assassination of Araceli, but berating Franco for leaving evidence and fingerprints at the scene. Upon seeing the video, General Chavez calls Franco for a face to face meeting.
90	90	"Bumawi"	January 29, 2021	N/A
General Chavez meets with Franco to pay him for assassinating Araceli Hernandez, but gives him a stern warning over double crossing him. Franco is unnerved, assuring him that he can be trusted. Back at the NIA, mang Nick updates his son about the many evenings the General lets him off early for secret meetings Nick suspects are connected with the syndicate. At an undisclosed location, General Chavez and Amalia are discussing Araceli's case and the absence of solid leads. She tells him about Nestor's threats. Meanwhile at the NIA, Colonel Manzano presses Sam to look into any individual with close ties with Dr. Araceli. Sam remembers they still have Araceli's lawyer to interview, specifically task about the video he recorded of Araceli prior to the press conference. Later, Sam updates Emman, who has Sam put the General under surveillance. They go for dinner where they run into Celine and Anton. General Chavez meets with Franco to pay him for assassinating Araceli Hernandez, but gives him a stern warning over double crossing him. Franco is unnerved, assuring him that he could be trusted. Back at the NIA, mang Nick updates his son about the many evenings the General lets him off early for secret meetings Nick suspects are connected with the syndicate. At an undisclosed location, General Chavez and Amalia are discussing Araceli's case and the absence of solid leads. She tells him about Nestor's threats. Later, Sam updates Emman, who has Sam put the General under surveillance. They go for dinner where they run unto Anton and Celine. After overhearing Celine accept Anton's engagement ring again, Emman is not able to keep his anger and emotions down. They get into a fight, in the scuffle, Sam or Emman lands a punch to Anton's chest, causing him to collapse. Elsewhere, Amalia arranges to meet with Nestor. She tells him she is on her way to bring his money. While Nestor waits at the designated spot, a car comes alongside. As the window rolls down, Nestor is surprised to see Leo, who shoots him dead at the temple. Shortly after, Amalia arrives to thank Leo and apologizes that she is not able to let Lester know his real father is the General himself.
91	91	"Pagbabanta"	February 1, 2021	N/A
Back at the Hernandez home, Celine tends to Anton. He inquires if seeing Sam and Emman together bothers her, Celine says she and Emman no longer speak to each other, often fighting because he doesn't share her belief that Robbie may still be alive. Her response that she no longer cares about him pleases Anton. At Emman's house, Sam is bothered by his adverse reaction to Anton and asks Emman if it matters that Celine and Anton are engaged once again. He says he experienced rage that Anton is able to resume to normalcy without being accountable for his actions. Meanwhile, at his DNS office, General Chavez phones Atty. Rabago, Dr. Araceli's lawyer, warning him of a similar fate as his client's if he keeps a copy of Araceli's video confession and last request. Elsewhere, Sam meets with Araceli's lawyer asking him to surrender Araceli's video. The lawyer first refuses, citing privacy and lawyer-client confidentiality privilege, but easily gives it up when Sam appeals to his compassion for the victims and other still missing children. Sam reviews a different video showing Araceli apologizing for her crimes to her children, further strengthening their claims of innocence. Sam and Emman face another dead end. At the same time in an undisclosed location, Franco Vergara once again meets with General Chavez. The topic of discussion is Atty. Rabago's video of Araceli's true confession. He tells Franco not to harm the lawyer until the investigation completes and the case is closed, worries that any untoward action against the lawyer would be suspicious. At the same time, Clarissa visits Amalia at her office, complaining of her suspicions about Leo's nightly activities. She believes he has a mistress. Amalia admonishes Clarissa for her paranoia, but is privately concerned that her friend's suspicions may lead her to the truth of Leo and Amalia and Lester's paternity. At the NIA, Colonel Manzano approves Sam's request to conduct a surveillance tail on General Chavez and authorizes her to interrogate relatives of all the deceased suspects. Meanwhile, elsewhere, the General concludes his meeting with Franco, and the assassin once again offers his service to the General. As he departs, the General notices he is being followed.
92	92	"Panindigan"	February 2, 2021	N/A
Leo confronts the NIA agent tailing him and threatens harm to his pregnant wife if he continues his surveillance. The NIA agent abandons his mission. Meanwhile, Anton breaks the news that Amelia refuses to give consent to a biopsy procedure to obtain a DNA sample from Lester's heart. Celine does not argue, later telling Anton that she understands Amelia and is ready to move on. As Amalia clears out her mother's clothes, she and Linda talk frankly about their respective feelings for Araceli. Amalia admits to Linda that growing up she was jealous of their close relationship. At Emman's house, Sam briefs Emman and Caloy on a new lead, Dra. Monique Calderon, a Pedia-Cardiologist and specialist in echo sonography, who graduated top of her class in med school in the States. Dr. Calderon happens to be the love child of the deceased suspect, Dr. Joseline Gomez. They find it suspicious that despite the confirmed involvement of her mother with the syndicate, she remains in the staff of specialists at A. Hernandez Hospital. The trio decide they will pursue her lead. That evening, Amalia calls Leo frantic over anyone discovering Nestor's corpse despite assurances from Leo that he has it covered. Clarissa overhears his conversation and appears troubled.
93	93	"Pagpapanggap"	February 3, 2021	N/A
Clarissa's suspicions over Leo's late night activities increases. Meanwhile, Amalia tries to knock some sense on Anton, calling his attention to Celine's sudden turn about. She warns Anton. At the hospital, Celine tends to Dra. Calderon's patients efficiently earning praises from the doctor. While discussing a patient, Anton arrives and Celine introduces them. Celine finds the doctor's reaction to Anton very strange. Meanwhile, at Dra. Calderon's clinic, Caloy is attempting a diversion while Sam and Emman rifle through her files. Caloy's commotion fails as Monique catches Sam and Emman in her office.
94	94	"Pasundan"	February 4, 2021	N/A
Despite revealing their credentials as NIA agents, Calderon orders Sam and Emman out of her clinic and refuses to allow them to interview her. Celine spots them outside the hospital. Emman admits to Celine about Dra. Calderon's relationship to Dr. Gomez, and asks Celine to help them with her. Meanwhile, Leo surprises Clarissa by canceling all his appointments to spend the day with Lester and the Hernandezes to celebrate Lester's birthday. Earlier, Clarissa voices out her concern over Leo's secrecy and instructs Nick to do something for her. Meanwhile, Leo instructs Franco to stage Nestor's death and frames him as Araceli's killer. Leo's only loose end is Atty. Rabago, instructing Franco to assassinate the lawyer once forensics confirm Nestor's gun to match Araceli's gunman. Leo is close to wrapping up the case. Upon Emman's request, Celine reaches out to Monique to apologize for their breaking into her office. Monique admits she never had a relationship with her mother who never acknowledged her, giving her up to her father to raise, but despite their estrangement, her gratitude towards her mother never waivered. She voices out her suspicions about the Hernandez children and promises to get justice for her mother's murder.
95	95	"Alamin"	February 5, 2021	N/A
Dr. Calderon and Celine talk about their true motives, agreeing not to speak about it with others. Celine tells Monique about her request to Amalia for a biopsy to confirm that Dr. Araceli Hernandez did not use Robbie's heart. Monique agrees it is risky at this time during Lester's recovery. Meanwhile at the Hernandez' mansion, Lester's birthday party is in full swing. With Celine, Linda, Leo and Clarissa, Anton, Arnold and Amalia in attendance, Lester goes into a seizure and is rushed to the hospital. Monique is the pediatric on call and she stabilizes Lester. A thorough check reveals nothing other thank a viral infection. Nick observes a certain closeness between Leo and Amalia. Leo's extreme reaction to Lester's seizure earlier, hints of a subtle intimacy between Amalia and the General. Nick observes his employer's over concern for Lester is strange and annormal behavior for a family friend and god father. At the NIA, forensics' reports a match between the prints on the gun and Nestor's corpse. Leo breaks the news to Amalia, unsuspecting Leo is the mastermind of her mother's assassination.
96	96	"Akusasyon"	February 8, 2021	N/A
Leo assures Amalia that his cover up of Nestor's murder is solid. He made sure all investigative and forensics results point to Nestor as the gunman with vendetta as motive. Meanwhile, Dr Calderon asks Celine and Anton for DNA samples. She performed a tissue aspiration from Lester's heart during the medical emergency. It was not ethical for her to do it, but it was the only way she could get answers for their questions. While watching the news, Linda expresses disbelief that Nestor was a cold blooded killer. Nick and Emman have the same doubts. Over at Leo's house, Clarissa hears the general again on the phone and suspects he has a mistress. They have a terrible row where Leo raises his hand against her. The threat affects Clarissa greatly. At the hospital bistro, Arnold and Analyn admit their feelings for one another. Bernie is heartbroken. That evening, Celine goes to Emman's home to obtain a DNA sample.
97	97	"Protektahan"	February 9, 2021	N/A
During dinner with Emman and his family, Celine tells them about Dr. Calderon's request for DNA samples to determine if Lester has Robbie's heart, which Emman readily provides. Bernie is arrested for assaulting Arnold after he drops off Analyn at her home. Devastated over Analyn's new relationship with Arnold, Bernie warns Arnold to stay away. The two fight outside Analyn's house. The brawl is intercepted by Barangay members, who promptly haul them off to the local precinct. Sam and Emman come to take Bernie away while Analyn and Anton retrieves Armold. Later, Anton cautions Arnold against the Salvadors, instructing him to call Anton before engaging with them. Anton tells Arnold he is valuable to him, but in truth, Arnold's value is his unwitting role and purpose as donor for Anton when his heart gives out. Meanwhile, furious and tired of Clarissa's suspicions and endless nagging, Leo seeks consolation at Amalia's. He spends the night with Lester and Amalia. Meanwhile, Emman tends to Sam who is experiencing flu symptoms.
98	98	"Selosan"	February 10, 2021	N/A
After spending the evening looking after Lester, Leo tells Clarissa that he is tired of her suspicions and no longer cares how she feels. Meanwhile, Dr. Calderon hands over the DNA results to Celine. Lester's heart is not Robbie's, further boosting Celine's hopes that her son is still alive. Emman is skeptical, he finds it incredulous that all the forensics findings conducted on Robbie is wrong. Celine tells him he can do what he wants with the information but she will look for Robbie. Elsewhere, Atty. Rabago is found dead, a supposed victim of break in and robbery. Upon the General's instruction, Franco murders and takes the lawyer's laptop and files, wiping out all evidence of Dr. Araceli's confession and instructions.
99	99	"Manipulahin"	February 11, 2021	N/A
Colonel Manzano refuses to close the investigation because of too many lose ends and unanswered questions. He argues that child abduction cases have increased, and the deaths of all their promising leads, the latest being Dr. Hernandez' lawyer, strongly support their suspicions that the syndicate operations survived Dr. Hernandez' death. The General is clearly angry over Colonel Manzano's obstinacy. He reminds his long time friend of the deadline to close the case. Meanwhile, at the Delgados, Anton asks Celine to marry sooner than later. Celine is troubled by her duplicity for agreeing to their engagement to find evidence that would find the truth of her son's death and disappearance. The DNA results give her hope that Robbie may still be alive and she intends to search for him. But despite the hope the test results gives her, Dr. Araceli's confessed involvement with the syndicate that kidnapped her son traumatized her, and all the love and trust she has for Anton is shattered. Celine tells her mother she cannot continue with the engagement and is struggling how to tell him. Linda fears her daughter faces grave danger as long as she remains within the Hernandez orbit. At the NIA, Emman is still trying to process the news that Celine gave him. Reading the DNA test results, he plans to investigate the clinic where the results were conducted. Upon seeing the results, Nick recalls seeing the same letterhead among the General's papers, while gathering the contents of his brief case when he accidentally spilled them. Nick wonders if the test results were fabricated.
100	100	"Hulihin"	February 12, 2021	N/A
Clarissa visits Lester and becomes unhinged when Lester inquires about his Tito Leo. Later and privately, Amalia admonishes Clarissa who is agonizing over Leo and threatening harm on herself. After Clarissa leaves, Amalia hears Linda soothing Lester, urging him to keep praying for his wishes. This incenses Amalia, warning Linda to stay away from intruding into their lives. Elsewhere, Arnold calls Bernie to patch things up. Bernie refuses, suspicious of a trap. Arnold tells him Analyn won't speak to both of them until they settle their differences. Bernie still refuses. Amalia, who hears Arnold, warns him to stay away from Analyn or she fires her. Later, Amalia is on her way to conduct her first international live auction of the children donors. Though always present when her mother conducts these events and is familiar with their business partners and the foreign agent representatives, Amalia is nervous. The General assures her the event is secure. He reiterates the same to Franco who assures him that the location and event premises are secured and will proceed flawlessly for Amalia, the clients attending and the children to be sold and auctioned off to the highest bidder. The regularly held event is the syndicate's largest revenue source, attended in person and virtually, by agent representatives of rich and powerful clients in the global black market. Not underestimating Emman, Franco asks the General permission to assassinate the former NIA agent. Leo denies permission fearing a red flag, but considers Colonel Manzano more of a threat who needs to be dispatched. Meanwhile, at the NIA, the Colonel, already suspicious of General Chavez, conducts his own research on the General and finds out that Franco Vergara worked in a special ops team with the General under a different identity. At the Salcedos, Caloy, Sam and Emman continue to look for and find new leads from Atty. Ragbago's email address. Agent Marcelo, their Forensics IT expert, retrieves the lawyer's password and emails. As they pour through his correspondences, a new email comes in - an invitation to the syndicate's live auction.
101	101	"Grand Auction"	February 15, 2021	N/A
Emman investigates the Forensics clinic, learning that the results were faked. The staff who conducted Robbie's autopsy are no longer in their employ and untraceable. Emman cracks the pass code to open Atty. Rabago's email attachment to reveal an invitation to the Second Life Foundation Live Auction. The foundation was found to be non-existent and event slated for today. Sam, Caloy and Emman rush to the location and find it heavily guarded. Unwilling to wait for Colonel Manzano's team Sam called for, Emman goes in ahead and successfully disarms guards surrounding the outer perimeter. Meanwhile at the A. Hernandez Hospital, Celine goes into Anton's office to call off their engagement. While waiting for him to return from a quick huddle with Arnold in Finance, Celine hears his cell phone ringing which she quickly retrieves. She takes down the number in the caller ID and is surprised to learn it has an area code from India. As she is about to put the phone down, another call comes in and this time she picks up. The clearly irritated voice on the other line says he is waiting for payment since he successfully smuggled the product to him from India. Celine recalls Anton's whispered conversation on his cell phone to someone in India during her son's wake. She quickly returns the phone and composes herself as Anton comes in. At the Live Auction, Amalia welcomes her guests with the foundation's mission. She points them to a video display of the Foundation's resources - images of children of various ages, happily thriving in a healthy and nurturing environment, being tutored, well fed and cared for, all being brainwashed to believe that their families have abandoned them and that they serve a higher purpose. The results, she proudly points out, are healthy children organ donors who can be sourced to her clients wanting to extend or improve the quality of their lives. At the A. Hernandez hospital, Anton and Celine announce their wedding date in two weeks. Elsewhere, as Colonel Manzano leads a team to raid the complex, the General's tail alerts him of the raid. Leo quickly calls Franco to abort the auction. As gunshots are heard outside, Amalia tries to calm her guests who are obviously distressed.
102	102	"Iligtas"	February 16, 2021	N/A
The NIA raid on the syndicate fails as Emman prematurely charges solo into the heavily fortified location. Taking on the security forces guarding the sprawling complex results into burst of gunfire, effectively eliminating the element of surprise. Franco who had been alerted by General Chavez, quickly mobilizes his crew to evacuate Amalia and her guests from the premises. Although Emman takes down many of the syndicate security force, the raid falls short. He narrowly catches Amalia who is whisked away into a waiting van. By the time Colonel Manzano and his team arrive, only the dead security members of Franco's team remain. As the NIA gather evidence from the crime scene, Emman is able to retrieve a cell phone and a wallet from among the belongings of one of the dead security, which he does not surrender to the authorities. The Colonel asks Emman if he is withholding anything, which Emman denies. The Colonel spots Franco aiming to shoot Emman. He quickly pushes Emman but comes within Franco's range and takes the bullet. He is rushed to the hospital in critical condition. Emman is unable to catch Franco who proves too fast for him. Meanwhile, at the Delgados, Celine tells her mother of her discovery of Anton's involvement with illegal smuggling. From the context of what she hears the caller say to Anton, she assumes smuggling means child trafficking. She recalls Anton telling her he purchases equipment in India. Amalia also tells her that Lester's heart donor comes from India. Linda pleads with her daughter to break off their engagement but Celine insists she needs to know where her son is and the only way is to remain close to Anton and Amalia. Elsewhere, Amalia berates Franco and the General, and announces a temporary suspension of their operations. She also wants to move the farm to secure the children. Franco assures her the farm is secure. Later back at the Salvadors, Emman shows them the phone and wallet he retrieved from the scene. They agree they will work the case on their own, and with the Colonel in critical condition, no one can be trusted. The next day, the General tries to find out what Emman discovered at the raid. Emman tells him nothing, except to reiterate his belief that the syndicate is still operational and they have protection from powerful people in very high positions that allow them to be untouchable.
103	103	"Kapatid"	February 17, 2021	N/A
Sam and Caloy discover a promising lead from one of the dead syndicate members whose cell phone Emman retrieved after the raid. Meanwhile, Anton and Celine announce their final wedding plans to Amelia, who tries unconvincingly to express her enthusiasm. Despite her private aversion to Celine joining their family, she gives them her blessing. Her dismay is not lost to Celine and her mother. Linda warns her daughter to be careful, reminding her of the fate suffered by Nestor. Shortly after, Emman calls Celine to warn her to stay away from Anton for a few days as they follow a strong lead that would bring them to Anton and Amalia. As she spots Anton coming, Celine pretends to admonish Emman for sticking his nose into her life. She demands that he stop trying to have anything to do with her because her mind is set, her suspicions about Anton were wrong, and she loves him and will marry him in two weeks. When he hears this, Anton is pleased. Later, Anton has a discussion over the phone with his sister who unleashes her anger over their marriage plans. Amalia accuses him of placing his love life over the business. She reminds him about disregarding the complications of Arnold's love triangle and Anton's failure to contain him. He doesn't notice Arnold entering the living room. Upon overhearing Anton telling his sister that Arnold is Anton's spare part for his heart, picked from the farm to serve that purpose. Anton turns to see Arnold, and realizes that Arnold heard everything. Shocked and disgusted over what he hears, Arnold runs away from Anton who rushes after him. As he catches up to Arnold, Anton asks Arnold to allow him to explain but Arnold would not accept any of his denials. Arnold fights hard but Anton is stronger and overpowers him pushing him off the ravine hitting his head on a boulder. During their struggle, Bernie decides to call Arnold to make peace. As Arnold grabs his phone, he manages to shout Bernie's name before he falls into the ravine. Panicked, Anton drives away, frantically calling his sister who does not respond. At that time, the General instructs Nick to go home. Nick decides to follow him from aboard Caloy's delivery bike.
104	104	"Relasyon"	February 18, 2021	N/A
Nick and Caloy stake out the hotel where General Chavez went into. The General spends a good part of the afternoon with Amalia. Leo wants to stop hiding their relationship because he wants to tell Lester the truth, but Amalia refuses. Later that evening, Caloy spots Amalia leaving the hotel. Elsewhere, Celine and Anton are meeting with the wedding planner and Anton is obviously distracted by his fatal argument with Arnold. At the hospital café, Bernie tells Analyn about Arnold's response to his call. Analyn refuses to believe him, growing concerned that Arnold is missing work the entire day. Meanwhile, pouring through the cell phone Emman retrieved, Sam and Caloy reconstruct various messages, pinpointing possible farm locations where the missing children could be housed. Sam and Emman visit one secluded villa, and find that its occupants, obviously children, were hastily transferred to another unknown location. Emman is desperate and frustrated that the syndicate is always one step ahead. Later that evening, Celine tells her mother that she's ready to take all risks to find her son even if she no longer loves or trust Anton. She refuses to share her plans with Emman knowing he will stop her.
105	105	"Robbie"	February 19, 2021	N/A
Soon after the fiasco at the live auction, Amalia's world comes crashing down when the organization removes her leadership position and advise her that they may suspend all dealings with her. Meanwhile, flashback to the evening of the raid in St. John's hospital, when Lester's transplant was interrupted by Emman's raid. As Amalia rushes her son to Villa Corazon, they catch up with the van transporting Robbie, seemingly hijacked on the highway. They discover Robbie missing. Amalia follows a bloody trail and sees his lifeless body in the river bank. Owing to Lester's precarious situation, she has no time to retrieve his body and they leave Robbie behind to stabilize Lester. Amalia is certain that Robbie is dead. As it turns out, the young boy survives, crawling to the main street where a vagrant befriends him. Meanwhile, Leo returns home exhausted from the day's events, further raising Clarissa's antennae that he is keeping a mistress. She is devastated when she finds a lipstick mark in his shirt's collar. Back at her place, Celine feigns concern for Anton who was distracted all throughout their meeting with their wedding planner. Linda warns her that if Anton and Amalia suspect her plans, they will not waste their time with disposing of her as they did with Nestor. Meanwhile, Bernie calls Arnold's number and leaves a rant as Anton listens. An idea is forming in Anton's mind.
106	106	"Salisi"	February 22, 2021	N/A
Working on their growing suspicions that the forensic report, dental records and DNA on the boy's corpse identified as Robbie were faked, Emman and his team dig deeper into their investigation. Celine's hunch that their son is still alive now becomes a possibility. Their lead brings them to a large residence but they miss catching the syndicate by what seems to be only moments before the raid, arriving at the hastily vacated empty farm. Bernie overhears the conversation and pleads with his brother to allow him to help in the investigation. Emman will not allow him, asking instead for him to focus on his nursing degree. Bernie is determined to help his family find out what happened to Robbie. He skips school and goes to the Hernandez' home instead, sneaking past the guards by walking in behind a catering van. At the Hernandezes, Anton and Celine are finalizing their upcoming wedding. Anton arranges for a food tasting. As Bernie slips into the mansion by walking in behind the catering van, he enters Arnold's room, expecting him to be there. While rifling through his stuff, he hears Amalia walking in, so he hides in the wash room. Amalia senses something off with Anton, so she summons him to Arnold's room to ask him where Arnold is. Anton admits to killing Arnold, infuriating Amalia, but not for fraternal reasons, rather due to the attention it creates: another murder victim who is related to the family. From his hiding place, Bernie hears everything: the diabolical reason for Arnold's adoption to serve as the spare part for Anton's heart, the children in the farm they use as resources for their organ trafficking organization, the syndicate - as Amalia enumerates her current problems with the syndicate partners. Bernie is disgusted at the evil and callousness of the siblings as they discuss the farm and harnessing its children resources devoid of humanity, as if the captives were animal stock. Unfortunately Anton catches Bernie when a worried Analyn, who on her way to check on Arnold, calls Bernie. Anton hears the cell ring and grabs Bernie.
107	107	"Mahuli"	February 23, 2021	N/A
Bernie manages to escape as Anton goes after him. He calls Emman and tells him where he is and what he heard. But Bernie, upon spotting Analyn heading towards the Hernandez home, turns back. He calls her and tries to warn her away, but Anton spots him and knocks him unconscious. He later leaves the village with the unconscious Bernie at the back of the car. Meanwhile, Clarissa visits Amalia and begins to rant about her cheating husband. Amalia has had enough. She raises her voice at Clarissa. Puzzled by Amalia's reaction, Clarissa leaves but thinks harder about her best friend's odd reaction. She recalls many "off" and awkward moments between Leo and Amalia in the past and connects the dots - catching them together at their solo dinner, the striking resemblance between their two sons that they could pass for brothers, Amalia's lip color and perfume is strangely similar to the color in Leo's collar and the perfumed scent in his shirt. She now suspects her husband and Amalia are heaving an affair. Meanwhile, at the Hernandez home, Celine is looking for Anton who leaves her alone with the caterers. While he takes off in search of Bernie, he returns disheveled with muddy shoes. As Celine asks him if he is alright, Emman barges in looking for his brother. Emman tells Anton that Bernie called him earlier from the Hernandez house, reporting the conversation he overheard the siblings about their connection with the syndicate. Anton denies that he has seen Bernie, and threatens to charge them with trespassing. Later that evening, Col. Gabo Manzano opens his eyes. Although he still can't speak, he tries to tell Marcelo something, especially with regards to the General. His fingers begin to tap but Marcelo fails to notice it.
108	108	"Bernie"	February 24, 2021	N/A
Anton transports an unconscious Bernie to an undisclosed location, summoning Franco to dispose of him. Bernie regains consciousness and attempts to flee but Anton shoots him dead. He instructs Franco to bring him to his home and stage a suicide. Meanwhile, Celine feigns concern over Anton, watching his actions and behavior closely, hoping to learn something. She tells her mother she doesn't believe that Anton has no knowledge of Bernie's whereabouts. Both mother and daughter suspect Arnold's disappearance may also be connected with the syndicate and the missing Bernie. Elsewhere, Clarissa is tailing her husband to a restaurant. She spots him with Amalia. She calls Amalia's cellphone on the pretense of following up on their coffee date, and catches her lying when she tells her she is still in the hospital with a patient. Meanwhile, Sam catches up to Emman, Caloy and Nick, relaying to them that the village's CCTV footage shows Bernie entering the village by taxi but never exiting it. An hour later, CCTV footage shows Anton leaving and is gone for three hours. As Emman tries calling Bernie once more, they hear his cell phone ringing upstairs in his room. Relieved that he is home, they rush in only to discover Bernie's lifeless body in his room, with a handgun in his palm.
109	109	"Kasalanan"	February 25, 2021	N/A
The Salvadors are shaken by Bernie's apparent suicide though they believe he was killed by Anton because of Bernie's discovery of the Hernandez' role in the syndicate. The Salvadors relay to the investigators everything that transpired that day, when Bernie told them about the conversation he overheard between Anton and Amalia, the CCTV footage of the Gated Village showing Bernie entering but never exiting. Police secure the crime scene and gather materials for forensic analysis. Over at the restaurant, Clarissa is acting strange when she greets Leo who arrives late. She tells Leo that she knows about him and Amalia, that she followed him all the way from his office to the restaurant and sees Amalia joining him. She begins to make a scene. Meanwhile, Amalia learns from Franco that he arranged for Bernie's staged suicide after Anton killed Bernie to silence him about the family involvement with the syndicate. She calls Leo and asks him to cover up the investigation of Bernie's death. As Anton leaves the hospital, Nick comes charging in accusing him for having his son killed. In a crazed state, he grabs a knife and gives Anton a superficial cut on his right arm. Anton has him arrested but Celine stops him and puts her foot down. The next day, as the Salvadors prepare for Bernie's funeral and wake, Celine comes to pay her respects. Emman voices out his disappointment with her continuing relationship with the very family that ruined their lives, took their son and now his brother. Celine is unable to speak because Anton arrives.
110	110	"Katibayan"	February 26, 2021	N/A
Bernie's body is lying in state for the traditional Wake. The first visitors are Celine and Anton. Although Celine is clearly grieving over the loss of her ex-brother in law, she is desperately trying to prove to Anton that she trusts in his innocence completely. Emman is bereft of yet another loss in his immediate family. He reminds Celine that their son was kidnapped by the Syndicate under Dr. Araceli's leadership, and his brother's death came after Bernie discovered evidence of the Hernandez siblings operating the syndicate. Meanwhile, Caloy and Mang Nick return bringing the food and snacks to be served at the Filipino (Burol) or Wake (ceremony). While Emman and Anton are arguing and exchanging harsh words, Mang Nick spots Anton's car and is infuriated that Anton is inside. He and Caloy break into his car. Nick's quick search is fruitful when he spots Bernie's wallet tucked in the back seat pocket. Meanwhile after their disastrous anniversary dinner, Clarissa heads over to Amalia's home to confront her. Clarissa melts down just as Lester enters the living room to greet his Godmother.
111	111	"Eskandalo"	March 1, 2021	N/A
Clarissa's confrontation with Amalia turns ugly when Lester comes into the living room and sees his Aunt threatening his mother. He jumps off his wheelchair towards his mother but stumbles and hits his head and is unconscious for a few seconds. Later at San Rafael Hospital Emergency Room, Clarissa witnesses her husband admitting to the attending physician that he is Lester's father. Devastated, Clarissa creates a scene at the hospital lobby, recorded by onlookers. Amalia exhorts Leo to pacify his wife. At their home, Leo and Clarissa have a big row as Leo is packing his belongings. He admits his affair but admits he does not love Amalia, he tells Clarissa he loves only her. This pacifies Clarissa who later agrees to work on repairing their marriage. Elsewhere, at Bernie's gravestone, his family gather, joined by Analyn who regrets their last conversation and her harsh words to Bernie. She promises to make up by helping the Salvadors seek justice for his death. Sam promises to investigate his death and cautions Emman and Nick to hold back their instincts for vengeance. In his situation room at their house, Emman grieves for his brother and his anger simmers. Desperation over their many failed attempts to catch the Hernandez sets in.
112	112	"Court Order"	March 2, 2021	N/A
The wallet inside Anton's van was illegally retrieved by Nick and Caloy when they broke into Anton's vehicle, so it can't be used as evidence. However, Sam believes they have a strong case against Anton based on the CCTV footage of the Executive Village where the Hernandezes reside, showing Bernie's last known whereabouts and later footage of Anton's car exiting. There is no footage showing Bernie exiting the gated village. Sam obtains a court order to bring Anton in for questioning. As expected, Anton gets off for lack of credible evidence, taunting Emman for his recklessness and culpability in the deaths of his son and brother. Emman loses his temper and assaults Anton, resulting to Emman's arrest. Although Nick manages to bail him off jail, the court issues a restraining order against Emman. Over dinner that evening, Anton brags about his triumph over Emman. Celine is not happy about it, but manages to keep her cool.
113	113	"Hostage"	March 3, 2021	N/A
Emman takes matters in his own hands and abducts Anton to an undisclosed location, torturing him to get to the truth about Bernie and Robbie. Earlier that day, Clarissa and Leo pay Amelia and Lester a visit. Despite Amalia's apology and promise not to continue her relationship with Leo, Clarissa makes clear that she can't forgive Amalia's betrayal. She does want to continue her relationship with Lester who is Leo's son and they pay Lester a visit. Meanwhile, the explosive videos of their confrontation at San Rafael Hospital goes viral, adding more fuel to the allegations that the General is the Hernandez' protector. The Joint Chief of Staff watches the exposé in the news. General Chavez' superior, General Ronquillo has suspicions but decides to wait and see what Leo does. The revelation of Lester's paternity further shakes Linda's calm and she pleads with her daughter not to proceed with her wedding plans regardless of their original strategy to gather evidence on Robbie's whereabouts. At an undisclosed location, Amalia inspects the new farm, while Anton fails to show up at their meeting. Franco does not know where he is as well. At the hospital, Sam and Caloy tell Celine that Emman is missing. Celine tells them Anton is missing as well when he failed to pick her up after her shift today. Sam has a bad feeling about it all.
114	114	"Katanungan"	March 4, 2021	N/A
Emman is unable to get any information out of Anton, and despite the heavy blows inflicted on him, Anton manages to free himself, knock down Emman and attempts to escape. When Emman catches up to him, Anton gains the upper hand and is about to shoot Emman when he suffers a heart attack. Emman rushes Anton to the hospital and goes into hiding. Meanwhile, Celine and Amelia are wondering where Anton is. Celine is worried about Emman and goes to the Salvadors to get updates from Sam and Caloy. This infuriates Caloy who questions her motives about marrying Anton. At the Hernandez' home, Leo tells Lester he is his real father. Lester is confused but just as children do, accepts the information. Amalia is angry and warns Leo about Clarissa's fragile state and the scandal about their relationship. Leo promises he will fix everything and protect her and Lester from the fallout of the scandal.
115	115	"Paghihiganti"	March 5, 2021	N/A
Anton survives the brutal beating he received from Emman but his heart is badly affected and is failing. He will have to undergo several delicate procedures and ultimately a heart transplant. Anton insists he and Celine marry before he undergoes the risky operations, accepting the reality that he might not survive it. Meanwhile, Celine continues with her charade and feigns concern over Anton's condition. Inside, she's very worried about Emman. She requests from Mang Nick to let her know once he shows up. This confuses Sam and Caloy, but Celine does not tell them her true reasons for sticking with Anton. Later, at Bernie's grave, Sam finds Emman and is overcomed with joy. She treats his injuries but is frustrated that he is now a fugitive of the law. She berates him for his rash and reckless actions. At the hospital, Amalia promises her brother that she will make Emman pay with his life. She tells Leo she wants him dead. Leo assures her that it is only a matter of time before they catch him. He orders a nationwide manhunt and promises Amalia an open and shut case, that they have the CCTV evidence identifying Emman as the man who brings Anton to the hospital. Anton's supporting statement that he was abducted and tortured by Emman would lock him up for the rest of his life.
116	116	"Pagtatago"	March 8, 2021	N/A
While Mang Nick, Caloy and other known associates of Emman are interviewed by law enforcement authorities, General Chavez grills Agents Sam Agoncillo and Marcelo Marquez, warning them they will pay with their careers if he discovers they knew Emman's whereabouts and did not disclose it. In fact, Emman is hiding in Sam's old home where her mother lived before she died. The home has been abandoned for many years, and no one among her associates are aware of its location. As long as Emman lays low in this place, no one will find him. Meanwhile, at the Delgado's home, mother and daughter watch the news unfold about the manhunt for Emman and his involvement in the abduction and torture of Anton Hernandez. Celine worries about Emman and the impossible situation he finds himself in. She is determined to protect him and keep him from going to jail again. Linda grows more concerned about her daughter's safety while she remains inside the Hernandez' orbit. Celine hopes to obtain evidence against the Hernandez siblings to clear Emman and know the truth about Robbie. Later, after their meeting with General Chavez, Sam and Marcelo pay Colonel Manzano a visit and find him awake. He desperately tries to communicate with them but is unable to speak. Through his fingers, he taps his laptop's password in Morse code. Sam immediately has him transferred into a more secure safe house with a handful of NIA agents loyal to the Colonel guarding him. With the Colonel's password, Marcelo successfully accesses Colonel Manzano's files and discovers the relationship between Leo and Franco, dating back to their early days in the military. The General's failure to disclose this during the early phase of the investigation when Franco was apprehended proves his complicity with the syndicate. The archived news articles reveal the two were Elite Special Ops teammates in a successful project which lauded the General as a hero and launched his career. Meanwhile, at the hospital, Franco, disguised as a male nurse, enters the Colonel's room at the intensive care unit, only to find his bed empty. The General is furious that he was not advised of the transfer. He and Franco suspect the transfer was initiated within the NIA among a small group who already suspect the General. Agents Agoncillo and Marquez know they only have a short timeline to gather the evidence implicating the General and expose the information before the General strikes back and covers his tracks.
117	117	"Protektor"	March 9, 2021	N/A
Mang Nick and Caloy waste no time at spreading flier photographs of the General and the assassin, Franco Vergara. As he exits the DNS building, Leo is rushed by a throng of reporters, everyone asking one question: did he know the assassin and is he the syndicate's protector. He is called to General Ronquillo's office once again, and this time, his superior takes him off the case and places him under investigation by internal affairs. Although General Ronquillo retains Leo in his position at DNS, he threatens a court martial if Chavez interferes with the internal investigation and violates his order to withdraw from the case. The General is furious but is not fazed nor cowed. Meanwhile, Linda can no longer keep silent about her daughter's dangerous plan and goes to Mang Nick's home to seek Emman's aid. As she leaves, she is being followed and photographed by one of Anton's men. Mang Nick calls Emman about Celine's dangerous plan. The episode ends with the unholy alliance - Anton, Amalia and Leo, toasting their soon to be successful capture of Emman. Could Anton be counting on Emman to come out of hiding and show up at the wedding?
118	118	"Sakripisyo"	March 10, 2021	N/A
Mang Nick regrets telling Emman about Celine's real plans against the Hernandezes and is concerned that Emman will get into more trouble if he comes to the city and tries to stop the wedding. This bothers Sam a lot especially when she realizes that Emman still loves Celine. She rejects Emman's request to help save Celine and basically goes ballistic teling Emman to go to hell. Meanwhile, Linda keeps trying to dissuade her daughter from marrying into the family responsible for her son's abduction. Celine naively believes that as a Hernandez she earns the right to know everything about Anton's family's dealings with the syndicate and find answers about Robbie's whereabouts. Elsewhere, in a shanty house by the seawall, a Mendicant woman feeds and clothes young Robbie and calls him Julio, after her presumably dead son. At the secure safe house where Sam transferred Colonel Manzano, Gabo is recovering and gaining his speech. His first words to Agent Marquez is to get help for Emman. Later that evening, the General calls Agent Tinsay for updates. His spy reports that Agent Agoncillo was gone the entire day. He orders the agent to tail her, certain she will lead him to Emman.
119	119	"Desidido"	March 11, 2021	N/A
Celine has second thoughts about pushing through with her wedding because she realizes she still loves Emman. While she continues investigating on her own, she contacts the caller from India who she intercepted from Anton's phone last week. Posing as Anton's secretary, she learns they smuggled a young boy into the Philippines as a donor for a heart transplant. From information she gathers, she contacts the boy's mother, Anya Lagari, who confirms her son was kidnapped on his birthday. The Indian authorities investigating the international organ trafficking later traces her son's burnt body to the Philippines, with a hole in the breastbone, identical to the supposed remains they identified as Robbie. Celine believes she is closer to the truth about her son and he is still alive. She is more resolute to proceed with the sham marriage in order to gain entry into Anton's syndicate world, hoping to piece together the real story about what happened to Robbie after his botched rescue from the syndicate. Meanwhile, Sam is devastated that Emman still loves Celine and gets very drunk. Unbeknownst to Sam and Caloy, Agent Tinsay is nearby listening to her rant against Emman. Agent Tinsay reports what he overhears to General Chavez who is pleased with the latest developments, confident that they can use Agent Agoncillo's anger to lure Emman away from his hideout.
120	120	"Pakiusap"	March 12, 2021	N/A
Sam continues to reject Emman's attempts to explain his feelings. Emman is determined to protect Celine and asks his father and Caloy to help him stop Celine's wedding. Meanwhile, Analyn keeps trying to contact Arnold, and learns he flew to America. Celine asks Anton to forgive and make up with Emman so they can have a fresh start to their marriage. Anton refuses. Later, at an undisclosed location, Arnold is being kept alive, hooked up to life support. Amalia tries to convince Anton to schedule his heart transplant before Arnold's heart gives way.
121	121	"Brainwash"	March 15, 2021	N/A
Caloy and Mang Nick prepare the supplies and ammunitions Emman needs to rescue Celine from her disastrous wedding, while Sam continues to avoid everyone's calls. Meanwhile, the General tries to intimidate Sam into turning Emman in, alluding to her past relationship with the fugitive and her unrequited feelings for Emman. Elsewhere, Amalia's henchmen are prowling the streets looking for children to kidnap. Franco's private army are feeling vulnerable. Amalia's orders to grab more children to fulfill her clients' need for organs continue unabated despite her dismissal from the international syndicate. Franco's crew are worried the exposé on their boss and General Chavez' affair has stripped them of the invincibility from jail terms which they enjoyed unrestrained. Later at the Delgados, Anton and Celine arrive from obtaining their marriage license at City Hall. Anton reminds Celine that he won't be able to see her until their wedding day in two days, a superstition that both Linda and Celine take lightly. At the Salvadors, Caloy notices a car surveilling them but does not recognize Agent Tinsay, who drives away when Caloy approaches him. At Amalia's office, General Chavez tells Amalia they have a solid plan to finally get rid of Colonel Manzano and execute an entrapment operations against Emman through Agent Agoncillo. Leo is eager to close the case so he can resume his relationship with his son. Amalia is wary as Emman has slipped their attempts so many times. Elsewhere, the General's spies follow Agent Marquez to Colonel Manzano's safe house and are on their way to assassinate him. Agent Agoncillo intercepts them in time while Colonel Manzano is able to leave his bed and downs his assailant. At Emman's hideout, Caloy arrives with a cache of weapons. Emman is worried over Sam's absence and silence since their quarrel.
122	122	"Patawarin"	March 16, 2021	N/A
The news breaks out on the attempted assassination of Colonel Manzano pointing to the syndicate as the mastermind. General Chavez' name is once again speculated upon by the media as the syndicate's protector. Later that evening, Emman pays Sam a visit to apologize for hurting her. He tells her he appreciates everything she's done for him and would like to have the chance to make up for it. He also tells her he needs his partner to help him rescue Celine but he understands if she declines. Sam responds by wishing him luck. The next morning Celine gets ready for her wedding and both mother and daughter are silent and sad. Linda tells her daughter it is not yet too late to back out and begs her to leave. At Anton's room, Amalia cautions Anton as well. She remains unconvinced about Celine but Anton is determined. Elsewhere, Emman gets on a motorcycle and heads out for the church. Later at the church, guests begin to mingle as they wait for the bride to arrive. General Chavez and Clarissa are among the guests. Anton's jitters are obvious to Amalia but he relaxes visibly when the wedding coordinator advises her that Celine and Linda are on their way. He inquires if Emman is seen around the premises. Their entrapment plan is solid, expecting Emman to arrive, as their private army led by Franco waits to catch him dead or alive.
123	123	"Panloloko"	March 17, 2021	N/A
Despite Amalia's stories about witnessing and overhearing Celine's concern for Emman when he went into hiding; despite his henchmen confirming that Linda has visited Emman's home, Anton remains set on the wedding. And we know why. He and General Chavez lay out a foolproof plan to lure, capture and dispose of Emman. Meanwhile, Sam is trying to decide whether she will help Emman or ignore him altogether. At the NIA Headquarters, Colonel Chavez is fully recuperated and back at his office. He reports his findings to General Ronquillo, who gives him full authority on the case investigation. Meanwhile, at the wedding venue, Celine arrives and is seated at the wedding chairs listening to the officiant's homily about the responsibilities of a husband and wife. Linda is visibly upset, even made more so by Amalia's earlier taunts about Celine's sincerity. Outside the premises, Franco spots someone looking like Emman and he sends his men towards where they saw him. Emman is closer than they think because he has Celine in his view.
124	124	"Wedding Vow"	March 18, 2021	N/A
Anton and Celine recite their wedding vows as Franco and his men track Emman's movements from the CCTV cameras. While Anton recalls bitterly how their hopeful relationship took a wrong turn when Robbie was kidnapped by his family's organization, his obsession with Celine drives him to destroy Emman, despite his discovery over Celine's betrayal. Celine struggles with her vows as she tries to stay on course with her plans to find Robbie as a Hernandez. As Emman watches them go through their vows, one of Franco's men apprehends him but Emman outmaneuvers him. Gunshots are fired and the wedding ceremony stops as the guests panic. Franco sees Emman on his CCTV monitors and directs his men to cover all exits. Anton does not let go of his grip on Celine and leads her to his men to bring her home. Celine refuses, demanding to know what was happening. Anton tells her Emman is there and he's going to end it with him once and for all. Alarmed, Celine begs Anton to spare Emman. This infuriates Anton further, admitting to her that he knew about their plans all along, but that it didn't matter because he wasn't going to allow Emman to come in between them. While Celine struggles to get away from the security detail, Linda catches up to them and tries to get them off her daughter. Just then, at the back of the venue's kitchen, Leo catches up to Emman who turns out to be Mang Nick. At the same time, by the pool area, Anton catches up to Emman, who turns out to be Caloy. Both men are dressed identical to Emman. At the parking lot, Emman overcomes Anton's security and is able to grab Celine. Linda tells them to hurry while she stays behind, knowing she would just slow them down. The couple flee to safety.
125	125	"Tulungan"	March 19, 2021	N/A
Sam comes through to save Emman and Celine as Anton and his men corner them. They manage to get a safe distance from the goons until they hit a dead end. They leave their van and head out on foot towards an abandoned stadium. Emman asks Sam to bring Celine to safety as he staves off the approaching men. Back at the wedding venue, Nick and Caloy are arrested and transported to the police precinct. Agent Marquez and his men intercept the transport and gains custody of the two who are relieved. Colonel Manzano is now in charge of the investigation and is working towards obtaining sufficient evidence to prove General Chavez’ collusion with the syndicate. Linda confronts Amalia and slaps her good, to the delight of Clarissa who witnesses their exchange of words. Back at the stadium, Sam hands Celine a pistol and tells her to use it when she has to. Celine thanks Sam for helping them despite the misunderstandings between them.
126	126	"Celine or Sam"	March 22, 2021	N/A
The unusual presence of heavily armed security personnel at the wedding, coupled with Leo's distracted behavior and his peculiar hands-on actions throughout the commotion following Emman's daring kidnapping of Celine heightens Clarissa's suspicions of her husband's collusion with the Hernandez's organization. She pieces recent events and conducts her own investigation, rifling through his papers for evidence or clues. Meanwhile, Leo spends the day with Lester who is disappointed that the wedding didn't push through. Leo assures Amalia that Emman will not go any further and will be caught soon. Amalia is more concerned about Anton who has failed to check in on her. At the NIA, although relieved that they are under Colonel Manzano's jurisdiction and protection, Nick and Caloy are advised that they face charges of obstruction of justice for aiding and abetting a fugitive. He tells them Emman would have to face charges as well and everyone will have to go through due process to get acquitted. The key is obtaining solid evidence of the General's participation that would charge and convict the Hernandezes and court martial General Chavez. Later, General Chavez storms into the Colonel's office demanding he surrender Nick and Caloy to DNS. Colonel Manzano points out that General Ronquillo gave him sole authority over the Emman Salvador and organ trafficking syndicate case. He also warns Leo not to interfere or he violates his superior's direct order to stay away from the investigation. Back at the stadium, Sam instructs Celine to stay put so she can help Emman who is running out of ammunition. Anton's armed security surround him. Sam arrives in time to provide him with backup, killing the assailants. They run back towards Celine. However, Anton finds Celine at the stadium. He instructs her to go with him but she refuses. In the struggle, Celine shoots him, and runs away. Franco and his men arrive to help the wounded Anton, who sends Franco to go after Celine. Seeing Franco as part of Anton's security force confirms Anton's involvement with Robbie's kidnapping. Celine puts up a struggle and is knocked unconscious. Emman and Sam arrive and fight off Franco and his men, but Sam gets injured and needs help. At that moment, Emman notices one security about to take Celine so Emman rushes to Celine. Still fending off her attacker, Sam overpowers him. Sirens blare indicating the arrival of the police, while Sam and Celine hide, leaving Sam alone to face the police.
127	127	"Galit"	March 23, 2021	N/A
Emman and Celine watch Sam being tended to by the EMT, unable to go to her for fear of getting caught. Sam is upset because they left her to face the authorities alone, the impact on her career for aiding a fugitive is not lost on her. Emman and Sam retreat in the darkness, taking refuge for the night in an abandoned structure. Celine admits to Emman that she still loves him very much. Earlier at the hospital, Analyn grows more suspicious about Arnold's abrupt disappearance and supposed sudden change of heart. She believes his disappearance is connected to Bernie's death and a coincidence is unlikely. Unknown to everyone, Arnold is in a coma being kept alive in a private solitary area in the hospital, being prepped as designated heart donor for Anton, whose heart is gradually failing. Later at the Hernandez's mansion, Anton is nursing his minor gunshot wound. Amalia pleads with Anton to stop his obsession with Celine before he jeopardizes any chance of a successful transplant operation, and eventually ruins their organ traffic operations permanently. But Anton is determined to kill Emman and take Celine back, to Amalia's intense frustration. Meanwhile, that evening, back at her apartment, Sam is contacted by Colonel Manzano who assures her that though she may face charges for aiding a fugitive, he will back her up for her actions for coming to Emman's aid. He updates her with General Ronquillo's order granting Manzano authority on the case and removing Leo's jurisdiction on the investigation. General Chavez is under internal investigation, which means they can aggressively pursue leads connecting the General to the syndicate without barriers and interference from Leo whose wings are clipped. Manzano believes they are close to catching Chavez’ involvement with the syndicate. Shortly after, Sam's father pays her a visit which didn't go well when he ridicules his daughter for allowing her emotions to drive her actions and common sense.Devastated and furious, she laments the fact that she has risked her career, risked her life many times, and damaged her fragile relationship with her father which she carefully nurtured over the years, for her unrequited love for Emman. Sam resolves to cut her relationship with Emman. In the morning, Emman calls to tell her where they are. Struggling to control her anger, she tells him to stay put until she comes to get them. Her last caller is General Chavez who hands her an ultimatum that if she doesn't deliver Emman to him as she promised, she will pay. As she heads out, Agent Tinsay is closely following her.
128	128	"Ipaglaban"	March 24, 2021	N/A
The episode starts with Clarissa barging in on Leo's telephone conversation with his men. She taunts him about his excessive interest in catching Emman instead of focusing on other issues like the spike of child kidnapping in recent weeks. When he leaves, she opens his safe, correctly guessing the passcode as Amalia's birthday. She finds titles to several properties she is not aware of, one of which is a property in Vargas, assuming it to be his and Amalia's love nest. She takes photographs of the title and returns the documents back into the safe. Meanwhile, Emman and Celine are spotted by locals who alert local authorities. Realizing this, Emman and Celine hasten to leave the area. Elsewhere, Sam is being tailed by Leo's spy, Agent Tinsay. Meanwhile at the Hernandez's mansion, Linda arrives to confront Anton. She exchanges harsh words with the two siblings. Amalia calls her a pathological liar. Linda asks her where Arnold is.
129	129	"Habilin"	March 25, 2021	N/A
Clarissa heads out to Vargas to see the property for herself to find out who lives there. It is an isolated area, near the bay, surrounded by large expanses of land, with unnamed winding roads. Her GPS has a difficult time tracking the exact location. The only sign she sees is “Vargas Compound.” At the Hernandezes’ mansion, Anton tells Amalia that Emman and Celine saw him and Franco together. This infuriates Amalia, because it seriously implicates Anton's involvement with the syndicate, but Anton insists they can simply deny it. Amalia cautions Anton that his heart may collapse any moment at the rate he is going.Meanwhile at the hospital, Arnold is still hanging on. The nurse looking after him is Analyn's colleague who has been taunting her about Arnold since he disappeared. Analyn runs into her and notices her carrying a vial of Propofil, a powerful anesthesia used for surgery, which Analyn finds peculiar particularly as she has no surgical patients. Shortly after, she overhears the conversation between the nurse and Amalia. She hears the nurse say that Arnold's kidneys are failing. Amalia instructs her to be ready to prep for an organ transplant for Anton. Meanwhile, Emman and Celine are running away from policemen who spot them. Sam arrives and saves them one more time. Despite her heartache, she hopes to turn him over to NIA instead of the police. Emman refuses to go with them, asking Sam to protect Celine. Celine begs Emman not to go but Emman's mind is made up. He reasons out that while Anton and Amalia are free, they stand no chance in finding Robbie if he is in custody. Unfortunately the cops arrive before he could leave. Sam cuffs him, reads him his rights and turns him over to the local police. Agent Tinsay reports the arrest to Leo. The General calls Anton with the good news about Emman's arrest. Anton tells Leo to dispatch of Emman while he takes care of Celine. He ominously pulls out his gun from the drawer. At the bayside area where homeless pitch their tent dwellings, Robbie is in a lot of pain and vomiting the food the mendicant woman gives him. She is alarmed at his condition and calls for help.
130	130	"Tadhana"	March 26, 2021	N/A
Celine accuses Sam of selfishness for abandoning Emman because Emman chose to love her. Although Sam realizes this to be true, she explains she had no choice since she needs to complete paperwork to have him transferred to NIA jurisdiction. Meanwhile, the police taking Emman detour to the port docks and stops the car. Agent Tinsay and the other police officer disembark to discuss their strategy but one of them shoots Agent Tinsay. He gives his gun to Emman and removes his cuff, telling him he is being released. Emman realizes soon after that he is being set up and runs, but the officer shoots him several times until he jumps off the dock. Assured of the multiple gunshots Emman sustains, the officer believes he is dead. Elsewhere in Vargas City, at Basco Hospital emergency room, Robbie is being treated for food poisoning and dehydration. The mendicant who brought him calls him Julio but says he is not her son. The doctor tells her that Julio will be alright and is being given an IV infusion to hydrate his body. Meanwhile, at the Salvadors, Sam visits Mang Nick apologizing for abandoning Emman. The news comes out shortly reporting the encounter between Emman and the police officers. Emman is being blamed for the officer's murder and is presumed dead. Despite the bad news, the Salvador family cling to the hope that Emman survives. Celine is distraught over the news but reminds herself of Emman's promise that they will be a family again. Sam is devastated and promises herself that if he survives, she will let him go. At the Hernandez’, the mood is victorious. Anton and Leo celebrate Emman's demise over a bottle of scotch. Amalia believes it is too early to celebrate certain that if he survives, he will bury them and the organization alive. Later, at Basco Hospital Emergency Room, an unconscious Emman is wheeled in after being found at the Bayshore with multiple gunshot wounds. He is alive and occupies the ER bed next to Robbie's. Robbie is closing into his parents’ orbit.
131	131	"Guilty"	March 29, 2021	N/A
At Basco Hospital, the attending ER physician tells Emman his bullet proof vest deflected all three bullets. The doctor recognizes him, and puts him under observation. On the other side of the curtain, Robbie refuses to speak and is belligerent, prompting the attending physician to order a psyche evaluation, suspecting the child suffers from severe trauma. Meanwhile, Emman gets up and escapes to avoid the authorities who he knows would bring him into custody. He steals a car and speeds away. He never gets to see or hear Robbie cry out at his attending nurses. Meanwhile back at the NIA, Colonel Manzano, Sam and Agent Marquez are interrogating the police officer who shot and killed Emman. They don't believe his report of the events but will let it go for a while to focus on gathering solid evidence against the General and Anton. Sam's witness statements against Franco and Anton are solid, so they prepare to bring Anton in. Later at the core team debrief, Sam hands in her resignation because she feels her emotions renders her ineffective in handling the investigation as she failed in her duty to protect Emman who, despite being a fugitive, is an important asset to the case. Colonel Manzano does not accept her resignation, instead calls on her higher responsibility towards the many lost children who are victims of the syndicate. At this point, Agent Marquez receives the good news that Emman is alive and at the ER of Basco Hospital in Vargas City. Sam is elated and calls Mang Nick with the good news as she hastens to get to Emman before the local police get him. At Basco hospital, the psyche nurse is being updated on Robbie's condition. With no identification, and the mendicant who brought him in has disappeared as well, they call Child Services. When they get to his bed, Robbie is gone. Later, Sam arrives in the hospital and is told that Emman escaped, but the doctor assures her that he is free of any wounds and broken bones. Relieved that he is alive and well, Sam later tells Caloy that she has finally let go of him, satisfied with his friendship. As she drives away from the hospital parking lot, she fails to notice that Robbie is behind her truck, sitting at the curb. Meanwhile, Anton is arriving at Celine's place and hearing breaking news of Emman's escape from the hospital. Anton is blind with rage as he charges into Celine's home.
132	132	"Survival"	March 30, 2021	N/A
Anton is furious upon hearing Celine tell her mother that she still loves Emman. He attempts to take her. Linda tries to stop Anton but he strikes her down and hard that she is left momentarily unconscious. Celine faces him squarely in the face, totally unafraid to admit the truth. He accuses her of betrayal and lies, and Celine returns his accusations with his criminal organization who took her son away from her. Anton tells her he will kill her first before he kills Emman. At this point Linda recovers, grabs a butcher knife and stabs Anton in his shoulder. Bigger and stronger, he taunts Celine to cry for help while pointing his gun at Linda. He is about to shoot when Sam and Agent Mendoza barge in. Anton flees. Unknown to all, Emman is outside watching Anton escape and follows Anton, knowing that Sam is inside protecting them. After the debrief at NIA, Sam and Celine clear up once again their misunderstandings. Meanwhile, at the Hernandez hospital, Analyn follows the nurse to the basement of the hospital and discovers Arnold. Her joy is interrupted by a security guard who grabs her. Later, the news breaks out about the nationwide manhunt for Anton Hernandez for his assault on Linda and attempted murder of Celine. The news implicates him with Franco and his alleged ties with the syndicate based on witness statements by Sam and Celine that the fugitive Franco Vergara was part of the security team guarding the wedding, and later tried to bring her to Anton. With Anton on the run, Leo persuades Amalia to sacrifice Anton to take all the blame for the syndicate, including Bernie's and Nestor's death. Leo will arrange the negotiation for Anton's surrender to clear his own name. Shocked and Devastated, Amalia rejects his suggestion. At that moment, the NIA led by Colonel Manzano arrives with a search and arrest warrant for Anton. The search proves futile since Anton is not there. The General is once again warned by Colonel Manzano that he must not interfere. Elsewhere, Emman follows Anton who drives to Vargas City and into the farm in Vargas Compound, where Franco and his men are headquartered and guarding the other kidnapped children.
133	133	"Sundan"	March 31, 2021	N/A
Shaken over the arrest warrant issued out for Anton, Amalia succumbs to Leo's plan to convince her brother to take all of the blame. She instructs Franco to keep Anton at the farm and heads out to see him. Meanwhile, Leo is summoned to General Ronquillo's office, where he is faced with more evidence of his ill gotten wealth and past association with Franco Vergara. General Ronquillo suspends Leo, puts him on leave and bans him from the DNS, which Leo does not take well. He screams at the General further incurring the ire of Ronquillo and is escorted out of the building. Outside, he has a run in with Colonel Manzano. Later, outside the Vargas farm estate, Emman is trying to figure out how to bypass the heavy security guards at the entrance. He gets his opportunity when a black van drives in carrying a screaming Analyn, distracting the guards as Emman slips inside the grounds unnoticed. The guards who imprison Analyn alert Franco. After speaking with her, Franco decides to use her as a potential organ donor since she knows too much. He orders the guards to extract blood from her and find suitable matches. Meanwhile, at the Chavez' home, Clarissa's suspicions heighten when she learns that her husband is suspended from his post and under investigation by the military for his connections with the syndicate. She recalls the heavily fortified compound at Vargas and the photographs she took, decides to call Mang Nick. Downstairs in his home office, Leo broods over his current state of affairs. As he pours himself another drink, he notices the cabinet door holding his safe is slightly opened. He checks its contents and notices the Vargas property title was moved into another envelope. Knowing he didn't do this, he suspects Clarissa, searching for her upstairs in time to hear her on the phone. At the Vargas Compound, Emman goes in and roams the corridor, and overhears Amalia being briefed by Franco about Analyn and Anton.
134	134	"Sumuko"	April 5, 2021	N/A
Clarissa has strong suspicions that Leo's secret property in Vargas is the Farm, the syndicate's headquarters where the kidnapped children are kept. She calls Mang Nick giving him the address of the Vargas Compound. Leo hears part of the conversation and confronts her about going through his titles. Furious at Leo, she admits she knows everything about his criminal activities. Earlier, Linda and Celine agree that Clarissa is key to catching Leo's involvement. Linda recalls how pleased Clarissa was when she witnessed Linda slapping Amalia. The mother and daughter head out to the Chavez residence hoping to gain an ally. At the General's house, furious over Clarissa's betrayal, Leo tries to kill her but Clarissa hits him in the groin and bashes his head with a table decor that stuns him momentarily and allows her to escape. She drops her mobile phone containing the photographs of the property with its heavily fortified compound. She rushes out in time to escape into Celine's vehicle. Unfazed, the General signals his men who are part of Celine's security. Over at the compound, Emman infiltrates the building. Amalia and Anton are having an argument over her decision to turn him in. Anton does not agree to Leo's escape plan for Anton's surrender, hospital arrest and eventual escape out of the country. Anton is furious but his anger is interrupted by the commotion and gunshots outside. Back at the Salvadors, Mang Nick forwards the Vargas address to Sam. She and Caloy quickly head out. At the Vargas facility, Emman closes in on the siblings.
135	135	"Magkapatid"	April 6, 2021	N/A
Clarissa runs out of the house and jumps into Celine's car and they speed away. The General directs his men to remove the women from the NIA agents protecting them. Meanwhile at the compound, Anton and Amalia are arguing over Amalia's plan to sacrifice Anton, when they hear the gunshots outside. Anton rushes out to investigate, while General Chavez calls Amalia warning her to leave the farm immediately. As Sam and Caloy head to the farm, Sam calls NIA for backup. Back at the farm, Emman discovers children hiding behind a wall structure. Caloy is also able to evacuate other children safely from their rooms. Anton spots Emman and gunshots are exchanged. Emman overpowers Anton whose own heart is beginning to fail, but Anton manages to slip away assisted by his men who come to cover him. Franco tries to bring Amalia out to safety but she refuses to leave without Anton. The NIA back up arrive taking down most of the Compound guards. Anton is injured by Agent Marcelo, but the siblings are able to escape. A short distance later, the van driver who was shot during the exchange, succumbs to his wounds and crashes into a ditch. At the farm, Caloy and the NIA team find Analyn and rescue the rest of the children held in captivity. Analyn alerts the NIA about seeing Arnold at the hospital basement, solid evidence against Anton and Amalia. Meanwhile, at an undisclosed location, two NIA agents assigned to guard Celine and her mother at a safe house are lured away by Agent Tinsay, who shoots them. Agent Tinsay is acting under General Chavez’ earlier orders to remove the women from NIA protection. Meanwhile, at the safe house, Clarissa recalls her devastating discovery of the Vargas property and her husband's involvement with the syndicate. She is heartbroken but more terrified that he will do everything to silence her. At the van crash site, Amalia hails down an oncoming van and is relieved to see it is Franco looking for them. They head out to one of the syndicate's safe houses - Casa Pineda. Leo is wary of its proximity to Manila, but Amalia says it is the only location where she can perform a transplant on Anton. Arnold is being prepped and transported to the place.
136	136	"Hanapan"	April 7, 2021	N/A
The episode begins at the hospital basement where Arnold is awake from his comatose condition, and hears the nurse prepping him for transport. He panics, slips into unconscious. While back at the Farm, Sam sends a team to A.Hernandez Hospital to rescue Arnold, only to be told shortly after, that Arnold succumbs to organ failure. His attending nurse is in custody but wouldn't say anything other than his heart was scheduled for harvesting for a transplant recipient. The trio figure out Arnold was adopted by the family to serve as spare for Anton's heart. The case's loose ends are close to completion. All they need now is a solid link to charge General Chavez and lead them to the siblings. At Casa Pineda, a furious Amalia loses it when she hears the news of Arnold's demise. The raid on the farm has stripped her of available donors for Anton's failing heart. Franco assures her they are secure because no one knows where they are hiding. Their anonymity allows them to relatively move about freely to quickly capture another donor. Desperate to extend Anton's life, she agrees. After the raid, at the NIA office, the Colonel extends his gratitude to Emman and Caloy for their key participation in rescuing the children and exposing the syndicate's headquarters. He gives Emman and Caloy the good news that General Ronquillo has cleared their names and they are no longer fugitives. Meanwhile, General Chavez is making arrangements of his own. After Agent Tinsay kills two officers of Celine's protection team, they are replaced with two unidentified officers, all moles for General Chavez. Back at their safe house, Celine is trying to contact Sam to relay Clarissa‘a discoveries about General Chavez, but there is no signal. Linda tells her not to worry because she has reported the same to Agent Tinsay.
137	137	"Hanapin"	April 8, 2021	N/A
The three women are suspicious of the house and area their protection detail moves them into, and grow wary of the new agents protecting them. The absence of Agent Tinsay is troubling. The safe house is too remote and the absence of any WiFi connection further heightens their anxieties. Over at the NIA office, Colonel Manzano debriefs Sam, Emman and Caloy on the developments, relaying General Chavez’ suspension and impending arrest based on their careful investigation and solid evidence. He offers Emman back his post at the NIA to which Emman accepts. Meanwhile, an NIA team under Agent Marcelo and Tinsay serve another search warrant on General Chavez’ home office. On their return, Marcelo tails Tinsay who outmaneuvers Marcelo and attempts to kill him. Marcelo, who trained under Emman, skillfully overpowers Tinsay and brings him into the NIA for questioning. Tinsay refuses to cooperate at first. At Casa Pineda, Amalia is having an emotional conversation with Lester asking him to be patient while she completes a medical mission. She later begs Leo to take them away from their mounting problems and possible capture. Leo promises he would but reminds her that Anton needs to have his transplant while they sit this one out in hiding. All eyes are on him now so he plans to eliminate his enemies first. His agents alert him that Tinsay did not check back in as he was supposed to. Leo assumes Tinsay was taken in. General Chavez gives the orders to the agents guarding the three women to assassinate them.
138	138	"Arestuhin"	April 9, 2021	N/A
Despite his initial resistance, General Chavez is arrested and taken into custody. Earlier, Lester witnesses the altercation between his father and the armed agents. Fearful for his father's safety, he begs him to go with them peacefully. Meanwhile, back at the safe house, two NIA agents discuss Agent Tinsay's arrest and General Chavez’ order to assassinate Clarissa, Linda and Celine. Celine hears them, quickly warning Linda and Clarissa. They try to escape but are caught. Celine manages to disarm one agent, as Sam, Emman and the NIA team arrive saving them in time. Earlier at the NIA, realizing the futility of assisting the General, Agent Tinsay buckles and points out where the three women are held. Elsewhere, at Casa Pineda, Anton dreams of Celine telling him she loves Emman. In his dream, Emman comes and shoots him. This renews his resolve to kill them both. Amalia tells him he needs to recover his strength, undergo a transplant and they will move away to a fresh start. Their hopes are dashed when Franco reports about the General's arrest and that Leo may no longer have the power to help them. They are on their own. Meanwhile, General Chavez is being interrogated at the NIA but he refuses to say anything. Colonel Manzano advises him of the solid evidences they have that would result to a very long sentencing. He tells him that many of his underlings are now cooperating with the investigation, providing damning testimonies about the various orders he gave to impede the investigation. Running out of options, Manzano advises his former best friend that leading them to the siblings’ hideout may help him with a reduced sentence. The Colonel brings in their case's high profile witness - his wife Clarissa, arriving with injuries she sustained from the attempt on her life on his orders.
139	139	"Kumbinsihin"	April 12, 2021	N/A
Clarissa's pleas to her husband to confess fails to move the General, but Emman's rage does. Fearful that Emman would take vengeance on Lester, Leo gives a confession, pointing the blame on Amalia, including what happened to Robbie after the aborted transplant at St. John's Hospital. Leo tells them they lost Robbie along their escape from the raid when their vehicle crashed and the boy ran away but fell into the steep river bank. Despite Leo's assumptions that Robbie couldn't have survived the fall, Emman and Celine cling to the hope that Robbie may still be alive. They anticipate Amalia showing up to retrieve her son at the government child care home. The NIA stake out the facilities. Meanwhile, Robbie's orbit is getting closer to his family's. While wandering the streets, Robbie is picked up by social workers and processed into the same government facility Lester is in. Robbie misses running into his mother in the lobby while Celine and Linda visit Lester and Robbie is being processed. Close by at Casa Pineda, the siblings realize it is only a matter of time before they have to move out of their hideout. Amalia advises Anton of his upcoming transplant, and her plans to retrieve Lester and implement their getaway plans. Unaware that Leo confessed, she ventures out in disguise to the child care residence looking for Lester. Impatient at his inability to act and desperate to exact his revenge on Celine and Emman, Anton attempts to leave but Franco stops him.
140	140	"Bawiin"	April 13, 2021	N/A
Linda and Celine tend to a very despondent Lester who refuses to eat, begging to be returned home to his parents. Celine is heartbroken over Lester's condition and starts the process of claiming guardianship so they can care for him and bring him home. Meanwhile, despite the visible security presence surrounding the grounds, Amalia easily gains entry into the building and begins searching room by room until she finds Lester. Their reunion is bittersweet. Although happy to see his mother, he is bewildered by her appearance. His mother promises to explain everything but asks him to remain silent throughout as she quickly wheels him out in a wheelchair. Earlier, while Amalia wanders the grounds, Celine spots someone who resembles her and goes after her. In her haste they miss another encounter with Robbie when he and his caregiver leave his room to take a stroll together. Meanwhile, Celine catches up to Amalia and Lester, shouting out loud to stop her. When Amalia pulls out a gun and shoots Linda, Lester runs towards his beloved caregiver Tita Linda. Amalia has no choice but leave the scene, rushing towards Franco in a waiting van nearby.
141	141	"Katotohanan"	April 14, 2021	N/A
Fleeing towards Franco's van, Amalia can't believe her luck when she runs into Robbie strolling with his social worker. Amalia grabs the opportunity for a bargaining chip to get Lester and snatches Robbie from the social worker. By the time Sam and Emman arrive at the scene, Franco and Amalia drive away with the young boy. In the aftermath of Lester's attempted kidnapping, NIA swarm the area, gathering evidence, piecing the events together. Reviewing the file created for the unidentified boy who Amalia snatched, Sam and Emman realize it is Robbie, heartened with the knowledge that his son is alive. At the hospital, Linda is recovering from her gun shot wounds, concerned about the trauma Lester is going through as he processes what he's seen and discovers about his parents. At Casa Pineda, Anton is surprised to see Robbie, who begs his mom's fiance to bring him back to his parents. Instead, Anton asks Amalia to add Celine in her negotiations. Meanwhile, General Chavez is being transferred to the NIA base. Despite the recent developments, the General refuses to divulge their location. At Casa Pineda, Amalia formulates a diabolical plan to retrieve Lester and escape authorities. She plans to lure Celine to bring Lester, kill Celine and then keep Robbie as spare parts for Lester. Her getaway plan requires precision to succeed and is convinced his recklessness will detail their daring escape. She orders Franco to secure her brother into an isolated location where no one can find him. They would get him after. Amalia is pronouncing her brother's death sentence. That afternoon, Celine returns to the Child Welfare home, behaving strangely. She trips the fire alarm and rushes to Lester's room, asking him to go with her.
142	142	"Anak"	April 15, 2021	N/A
With Robbie as her hostage, Amalia contacts Celine and gives her the terms for an exchange: come alone and bring Lester with her in exchange for Robbie. Alarmed that Emman will not allow her go alone, she acts on her own and takes Lester from the child shelter. At Casa Pineda, Amalia remains uncertain if Anton would stick to the carefully planned swap and escape. Unwilling to take a chance, she sedates Anton and transfers him to another location nearby, locked down to ensure he does not ruin their escape. Emman goes to General Chavez, the only person who can point out the siblings’ hiding place. Emman begs General Chavez, who refuses at first, but relents when he realizes cooperating may be the only means to redeem himself in his son's eyes. Celine arrives at Casa Pineda alone. Wise to Amalia's deceptions, she leaves Lester temporarily with an unknown individual in a house nearby. She wants to make sure Robbie is safe before she directs them to Lester. Amalia is furious, but she brings Robbie out. She warns Celine that if she doesn't have Lester, she would kill them both, and Robbie will be tortured first. Celine hurriedly gives them Lester's location. Amalia orders Franco to fetch her son. Racing against time, Emman and the NIA surround Casa Pineda.
143	143	"Against All Odds Finale"	April 16, 2021	N/A
As Franco tries to get Robbie at the location Celine left him at, he runs into Sam and Emman and engage in a shootout. He is gun downed and killed. Emman and Sam arrive at Casa Pineda, but she seizes Robbie and warns the couple she will kill Robbie if she doesn't get Lester back. Emman refuses to concede and overpowers Amalia. Dr. Amalia Hernandez, renowned cardiologist and philanthropist, is finally arrested and taken into custody. The reign of terror is over. In the aftermath of the syndicate's fiercest assassin's death and its leader's capture, Anton wakes up from his heavy sedation and realizes he is locked and can't escape. He makes several attempts but is weakened by his failing heart and succumbs to massive heart failure. With indescribable joy, Robbie reunites with his parents and grandfather. Emman and Celine enjoy a happy reunion with their son as they had said they would, against all odds. General Chavez is court martialed and sentenced to life imprisonment without the possibility of parole, his punishment reduced from the death penalty because of his cooperation. Handcuffed to her hospital bed while recovering from her gunshot injury, when she realizes Franco is dead, she begs Emman and Celine to find him since she didn't know where Franco hid her brother. Emman and Celine tell her she essentially gave her brother his death sentence and she will live rest of her life in prison with this heavy guilt in her heart. Clarissa, as Leo's wife and Lester's step mother and Godmother, is granted guardianship of Lester, and the boy resumes his relationships with Linda, Celine and the Salvadors. He is saddened by the loss of his parents but he thrives with the family he has left. He and Clarissa visit the General regularly, and as Emman told him earlier, his son will forgive him and always love him. Amalia serves her lifetime penalty in prison, the alpha in her prison community, miserable and devoid of the prestige, glamour and wealth she once enjoyed as a free individual. Analyn is devastated that she wasn't able to save Arnold in time. She suffers the loss of another loved one, but is fortified with the knowledge that she helped in solving the case of his disappearance. Caloy becomes an NIA agent and is successful in courting Sam. Caloy, Sam and Emman are awarded a congressional medal of valor for their role in bringing down the syndicate. Colonel Manzano is promoted to General, taking over Leo's position as Commissioner of Department of National Security. A year later at Robbie's birthday party, in front of all his friends and family, including Lester, he gets his wish fulfilled. Emman gets down on his knees and proposes to Celine and she accepts.
