= Walang Hanggang Paalam =

2020–21 Philippine television drama series

- Title card
- Also known as: Irreplaceable
- Genre: Drama; Romance
- Created by: Rondel P. Lindayag; Joel Mercado
- Written by: Nathaniel Arciaga; David Franche Diuco; Li Candelaria; Abby Parayno; Maren Kyle Lorenyo
- Directed by: Emmanuel "Manny" Q. Palo; Darnel Joy R. Villaflor; Andoy L. Ranay
- Creative director: Allan Cuadra
- Starring: Paulo Avelino; Zanjoe Marudo; Arci Muñoz; Angelica Panganiban; JC Santos
- Music by: Jessie Lasaten
- Opening theme: "Walang Hanggang Paalam" by Erik Santos; "Walang Hanggang Paalam" by Lian Kyla
- Composer: Joey Ayala
- Country of origin: Philippines
- Original language: Filipino
- No. of seasons: 1
- No. of episodes: 143 (list of episodes)

Production
- Executive producer: Roldeo T. Endrinal
- Producers: Carlina D. dela Merced; Cathy Magdael-Abarrondo; Eleanor Martinez
- Production locations: Metro Manila; Subic, Zambales; Negros Occidental
- Editors: Emerson Torres; Ashley Austria; John Ryan Bonifacio; Rhomar Cervantes; Ryan Bonifacio; Princess Oween Calderon; Rayven Ayn Lopez; Ron Joseph Ilagan
- Production company: Dreamscape Entertainment

Original release
- Network: Kapamilya Channel
- Release: September 28, 2020 – April 16, 2021

Walang Hanggang Paalam (transl. never ending goodbye / international title: Irreplaceable) is a Philippine television drama romance series broadcast by Kapamilya Channel. Directed by Emmanuel Q. Palo, Darnel Joy R. Villaflor and Andoy Ranay, it stars Paulo Avelino, Zanjoe Marudo, Arci Muñoz, Angelica Panganiban and JC Santos. The series premiered on the network's Primetime Bida line up on September 28, 2020. The series concluded on April 16, 2021, with a total of 143 episodes.

== Plot ==
Emerging from a terrible event that changes the course of his life, Emman finds a stable job and lives a simple life in the province of Alcala with his father and brother. Blessings continue to come Emman's way when he reunites with his son, Robbie, for the child's birthday celebration and finally buries the hatchet with his ex-wife Celine. However, Celine's fiancé Anton cannot help but burn with jealousy despite her continued reassurance. As their reunion nears its end, things take a turn for the worse when an unidentified man takes Robbie captive in broad daylight. The story of Emman's and Celine's loss is every parent's nightmare. To lose one's child is devastating, and to lose them to an organ trafficking syndicate preying on defenseless and innocent children is an abomination. The couple, once estranged, come together to search for their son, and discover their love for one another is still there. In the process, they discover the betrayal of people they trust, and the evil permeating within their community.

== Cast and characters ==
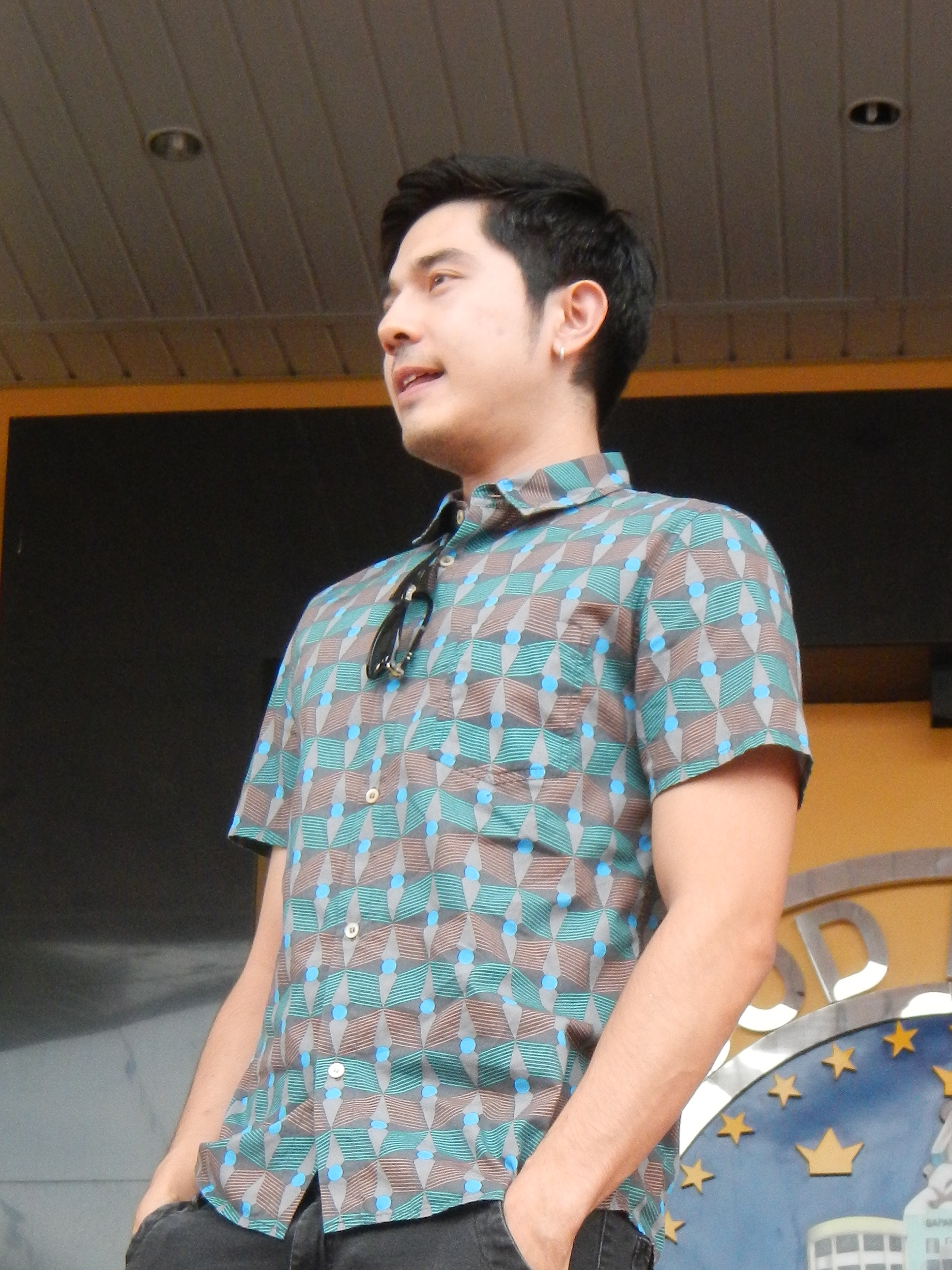
Paulo Avelino portrays Emmanuel "Emman" Salvador.

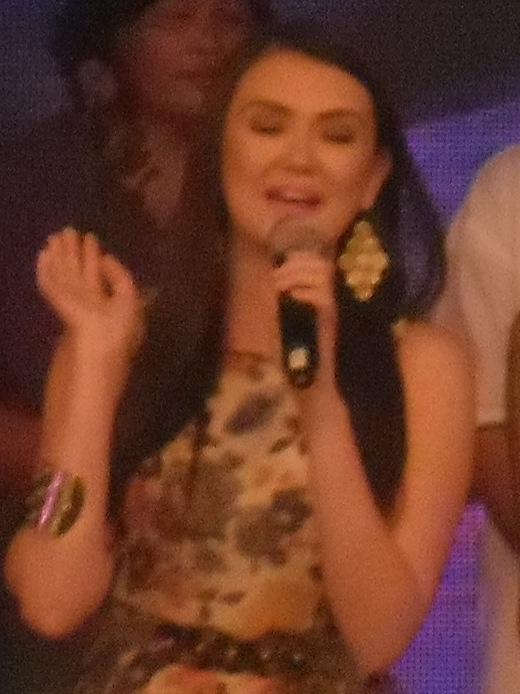
Angelica Panganiban portrays Celine Delgado.

Main cast

- Paulo Avelino as Emmanuel "Emman" Salvador
- Zanjoe Marudo as Antonio "Anton" Hernandez
- Arci Muñoz as Samantha "Sam" Agoncillo
- Angelica Panganiban as Celine Delgado

Supporting cast

- JC Santos as Carlos "Caloy" Rivera
- Cherry Pie Picache as Dr. Amelia Hernandez
- Tonton Gutierrez as Gen. Leonardo "Leo" Chavez
- Lotlot de Leon as Linda Delgado
- Ronnie Lazaro as Nicholas "Nick" Salvador
- Sherry Lara as Dr. Araceli "Cely" Hernandez
- McCoy de Leon as Bernardo "Bernie" Salvador
- Mary Joy Apostol as Analyn Legaspi
- Victor Silayan as Franco Vergara / Diego Villanueva
- Javi Benitez as Arnold Hernandez
- Marvin Yap as Marcelito "Marcelo" Marquez
- Arthur Acuña as Col. Gabriel "Gabo" Manzano
- Ana Abad Santos as Clarissa Chavez
- Robbie Wachtel as Roberto "Robbie" D. Salvador
- Yñigo Delen as Lester Hernandez / Lester H. Chavez
- Al Gatmaitan as Maj. Dante Francisco

Guest cast

- Jake Cuenca as Dexter Joaquin
- Jun Nayra as PCpt. Ferdinand Galang
- Joko Diaz as Nestor Elardo
- Jong Cuenco as Col. Homer Agoncillo

== Production ==
The project was first unveiled on February 11, 2020, as Burado. Julia Montes, Nadine Lustre and Thai actor Denkhun Ngamnet were initially cast for the leading roles. Initial scenes were already shot in Thailand. In March 2020, production was halted due to the COVID-19 pandemic in the Philippines. In spite of the ABS-CBN shutdown due to the expired franchise, production has reportedly been pushed through. On June 9, 2020, Julia Montes and Nadine Lustre backed out of the project. Arci Muñoz took over one of their roles, with Angelica Panganiban filling the gap a month later. On August 10, 2020, Dreamscape stated that Burado was cancelled due to pandemic restrictions, taking the toll on its production and Denkhun Ngamnet is unable to travel to the Philippines. Instead, the project was renamed to Walang Hanggang Paalam.

During the drama's media conference on September 25, 2020, via Zoom and YouTube, Angelica Panganiban announced that Walang Hanggang Paalam will be her "final project" and declares her retirement from television dramas.

Walang Hanggang Paalam was also taped on July 10, 2020, coinciding with the House of Representatives rejecting the new franchise for ABS-CBN. The cast became emotional after they heard the news.

== Broadcast ==
Walang Hanggang Paalam premiered on September 28, 2020, on cable and satellite via Kapamilya Channel, with simulcast on The Filipino Channel. The series made its premiere on free-to-air television via A2Z Channel 11 on October 10, 2020 and TV5 (through TodoMax Primetime Singko line up) on March 8, 2021.

It also aired on Jeepney TV as simulcast with Kapamilya Channel from September 28, 2020 to April 16, 2021 as simulcast from Kapamilya Channel and Kapamilya Online Live, replacing the reruns of Los Bastardos; and as rerun from November 13, 2023 to February 16, 2024, replacing the reruns of Dolce Amore.

It began airing reruns on Kapamilya Channel's Kapamilya Gold afternoon block, Kapamilya Online Live, and A2Z's Zuper Hapon from July 29, 2024 to January 11, 2025, replacing the reruns of Dirty Linen and will be replaced by the reruns of Huwag Kang Mangamba.

=== Accolades ===
Year	Award	Category	Recipient	Result	Ref.
2021	23rd Gawad PASADO Awards	PinakaPASADOng Aktor sa Telebisyon (Best Actor)	Paulo Avelino	Won	

== See also ==
- List of Kapamilya Channel original programming
- List of A2Z (TV channel) original programming
- List of TV5 (Philippine TV network) original programming
- List of programs broadcast by ABS-CBN
- List of programs broadcast by Jeepney TV
- List of ABS-CBN Studios original drama series
