= Andrew =

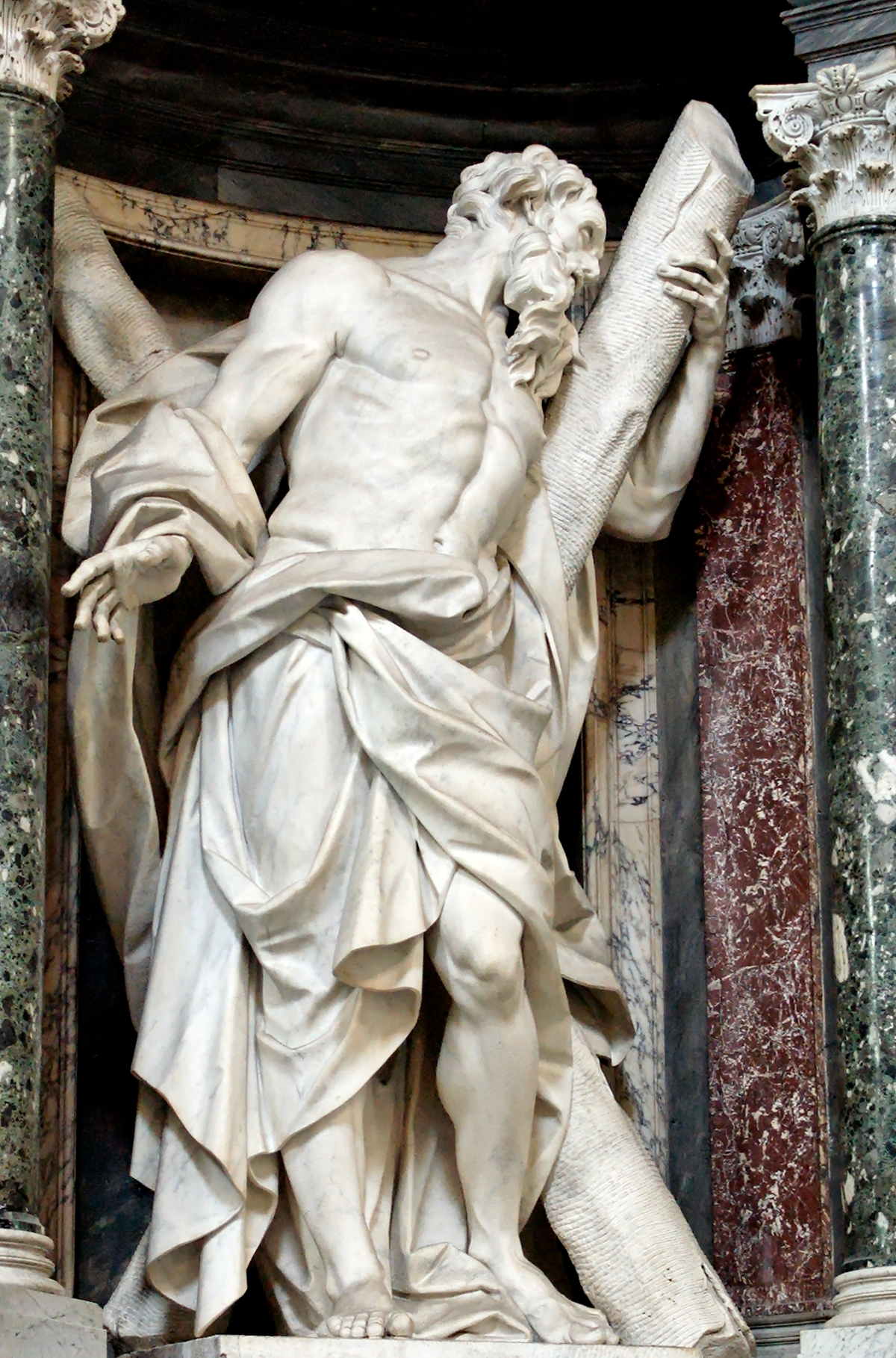
- Saint Andrew
- Pronunciation: /ˈændruː/
- Gender: Male
- Name day: November 30

Origin
- Language: Greek
- Meaning: manly, strong and brave
- Region of origin: Greece

Other names
- Nicknames: Andy, Drew, Dru
- Related names: Ander, Andros, Anders, Anderson, André, Andrei, Andreu, Andris, Andrius, Andrejs, Andrzej, Jędrzej, Andriy, Andrea, Andreas, Andrés, Ondřej, Ondrej, Andrean

Andrew is the English form from the Old French name Andreu / Andrieu (now French surnames), themselves from Latin Andreas, from Greek-derived given name Andreas (Greek: Ἀνδρέας). It is related to Ancient Greek: ἀνήρ/ἀνδρός aner/andros, "man" (as opposed to "woman"), thus meaning "manly" and, as consequence, "brave", "strong", "courageous", and "warrior".

== Variants by language ==
=== Masculine ===
- Ander (Basque)
- Anders (Danish, Finnish, German, Norwegian, Swedish)
- Andi (Albanian, Indonesian)
- Andis, Andijs, Andrejs, Andris, Andžejs, Anžejs, Endijs (Latvian)
- Andrai (Ziyadi)
- András, Endre (Hungarian)
- Andarāwus (Arabic)
- Andraž (Slovene)
- André (Canadian, Catalan, Corsican, Danish, Dutch, English, Estonian, French, German, Hungarian, Icelandic, Latin, Luxembourgish, Polish, Portuguese, Romanian, Slovak, Slovenian, Swedish)
- Andrea (Albanian, Italian, Latin)
- Andreas (Armenian, Cypriot Greek, Danish, German, Greek, Norwegian, Icelandic, Indonesian, Swedish, Turkish, Welsh)
- Andrei/Andrey (Romanian, Belarusian, Russian)
- Andrej (Croatian, Slovak, Slovene)
- Andreja, Andrija (Croatian, Montenegrin, Serbian, Slovak, Slovene)
- Andrėjus, Andrius (Lithuanian)
- Andres (Estonian, Norwegian)
- Andrés (Spanish)
- Andreu (Catalan, Spanish, German, French)
- Andries (Dutch, Afrikaans)
- Andrii, Andriy (Ukrainian)
- Andros (Greek)
- Andrzej, Jędrzej (Polish)
- Antero, Antti (Finnish)
- Ondřej (Czech)
- Ondrej (Slovak)

=== Feminine ===
- Andrea (worldwide)
- Andréia (Portuguese)
- Andréanne, Andréane, Andrée (French)
- Andreea (Romanian)
- Andreina (Italian)
- Andreja (Croatian, Slovene)
- Andrijana (Macedonian, Serbian)

== Surnames derived from the name and its variants ==
- Anderle
- Anders
- Andersen
- Anderssen
- Anderson
- Andersson
- Andrássy
- Andreas
- Andrei
- Andreou
- Andres
- Andrew
- Andrews
- Andros
- Drew

=== Czech surnames ===
Antonín Kotík lists the following Czech surnames derived from the name: Ondřej, Ondřejc, Vondřejec, Ondřejek, Ondřejk, Vondřejk, Ondřík, Ondrejk, Ondrejka, Ondříček, Ondřejíček, Ondra, Vondra, Vondrů, Vondrovic, Vondrovec, Onderka, Onderek, Ondrák, Vondrák, Vůndrák, Vondráč, Vondráček, Ondráš, Ondrášek, Vondrášek, Vondrouš, Vondroušek, Ondroušek, Vondruška, Vondrys, Vondrejs, Vondřejš, Vondrysek, Ondřiska, Ondřich, Vondřich, Vondřech, Vondrych, Ondrouch, Ondrách, Ondříšek, Oneš, Voneš, Vonáš, Vonášek, Vonásek, Vonka, Vonáček, Voňátko, Ondok, Vondulka, Andreáš, Andres, Andrýs, Endrys, Andrejs, Andrejš, Andrysek, Andrejsek, Andresík, Andreska, Vandruška, Andráško, Andrášek, Andrysák, Andrs, Endrs, Endrst, Endršt,[Andr, Andrt, Andrák, Anděra, Anderka, Andriál, Andrle, Andrdle, Endrle, Endlíček, Andrlík, Andys, Endyš, Endrej, Jendrûlek, Povondra.

Also: Ondráček, Ondrík.

=== French surnames ===
André; North, Normandy and Occitanie : Andrieu, Andrieux; North : Andrez; East : Andrey; Limousin : Andreix; North, Occitanie : Andreu.

=== East and West Slavic surnames ===
Andreyev, Andrienko, Androsov, Andrusak, Andrușceac (Romanian spelling) Andrushchak, Andruszak, Andruszczak, Andruszkiewicz, Andruszkow, Andrusov

=== South Slavic surnames ===
Andrejević, Andrejić, Andreychin, Andrijević, Andrić, Androić

== See also ==
- Andy (given name)
- Drew (name)
- List of people with given name Andrew
- List of storms named Andrew
