= Jędrzej =

- Gender: Male
- Language: Polish
- Name day: 30 November, 16 May

Origin
- Origin: Greek
- Meaning: Andrew
- Region of origin: Greece

Other names
- Related names: Andrew, Andrei, Andrejs, Andriy, Andrey, Andrej, Ander, Anders, Andre, Andrea, Andreas, Andrés, Andreu

Jędrzej is a variant Polish form of the given name Andrzej (Andrew).

Notable individuals with the given name include:

- Jędrzej Giertych (1903–1992), Polish politician, journalist and writer
- Jędrzej Gruszczyński (born 1997), Polish volleyball player
- Jędrzej Jędrych (born 1967), Polish politician
- Jędrzej Kitowicz (1728–1804), Polish historian and diarist
- Jędrzej Maćkowiak (born 1992), Polish volleyball player
- Jędrzej Moraczewski (1870–1944), Polish politician, Prime Minister of Poland and Minister of Public Labour
- Jędrzej Śniadecki (1768–1838), Polish essayist, satirist, physician, chemist, biologist and philosopher
