= Andrzej =

- Pronunciation: Polish: [ˈandʐɛj]
- Gender: Male
- Language: Polish
- Name day: 30 November

Origin
- Origin: Greek for "man"
- Meaning: Andrew
- Region of origin: Greece

Other names
- Related names: Andrew, Andrei, Andrejs, Andriy, Andrey, Andrej, Ander, Anders, Andre, Andrea, Andreas, Andrés, Andreu, Jędrzej

Andrzej is the Polish form of the given name Andrew. It may refer to:

== People ==
- Andrzej Alexiewicz (1917–1995), Polish mathematician
- Andrzej Bartkowiak (born 1950), Polish film director and cinematographer
- Andrzej Bobola (1591–1657), Polish saint, missionary and martyr
- Andrzej Chyra (born 1964), Polish actor
- Andrzej Czarniak (1931–1985), Polish alpine skier
- Andrzej Deskur (actor) (born 1972), Polish actor
- Andrzej Domański (born 1981), Polish economist and politician
- Andrzej Duda (born 1972), Polish lawyer, politician and 6th president of Poland
- Andrzej Elżanowski (1950–2026), Polish paleontologist
- Andrzej Jajszczyk (born 1952), Polish electrical engineer and academic
- Andrzej Kokowski (born 1953), Polish archaeologist
- Andrzej Konopka (actor) (born 1969), Polish actor
- Andrzej Krauze (born 1947), Polish-British cartoonist and illustrator
- Andrzej Leder (born 1960), Polish philosopher and psychotherapist
- Andrzej Mazurczak (born 1993), Polish basketball player
- Andrzej Mleczko (born 1949), Polish illustrator
- Andrzej Nowacki (born 1953), Polish artist
- Andrzej Nowicki (writer) (1909–1986), Polish poet
- Andrzej Olechowski (1947–2026), Polish economist and politician
- Andrzej Paczkowski (born 1938), Polish historian
- Sir Andrzej Panufnik (1914–1991), Polish composer
- Andrzej Person, Polish sports journalist and politician
- Andrzej Piaseczny (born 1971), Polish singer, songwriter, actor and television personality
- Andrzej Sapkowski (born 1948), Polish fantasy writer
- Andrzej Sarwa (born 1953), Polish writer
- Andrzej Sekuła (born 1954), Polish cinematographer and film director
- Andrzej Skowroński (1953–2020), Polish rower
- Andrzej Strzelecki (1952–2020), Polish actor
- Andrzej Tomaszewicz (1943–2020), Polish politician
- Andrzej Wajda (1926–2016), Polish film director
- Andrzej Załuski (1695–1758), Polish bishop
- Andrzej Zoll (born 1942), Polish lawyer and judge

== Fictional characters ==
- Andrzej Kmicic, protagonist of Henryk Sienkiewicz's novel The Deluge

== See also ==
- Andrei
- Andrej
- Andrey
- Andrei (surname)
- Ondrej
- Ondřej
