= Andrey =

- Pronunciation: Belarusian: [anˈdrɛj] Bulgarian: [ɐnˈdrɛj] Russian: [ɐnˈdrʲej] Spanish: [anˈdɾei̯]
- Gender: Male
- Language: Belarusian, Bulgarian, Russian, Spanish
- Name day: November 30

Origin
- Origin: Greek

Other names
- Related names: Andrew, Andreas, Andre, Ander, Anders, Andy, Andrejs, Andrzej, Andriy, Andrea, Andrés, Andrej, Andrei, Ondrej, Ondřej

Andrey (Андрей) is a masculine given name predominantly used in Slavic languages, including Belarusian, Bulgarian, and Russian. The name is derived from the ancient Greek Andreas (Ἀνδρέας), meaning "man" or "warrior".

In Eastern Orthodox Christianity, Andrey holds religious significance, particularly due to Saint Andrew, the patron saint of several countries, whose legacy has contributed to the name’s popularity across Orthodox nations.

In Spanish-speaking countries, Andrey can be interpreted as a portmanteau of the name Andrés and Rey, the Spanish word for king.

== People with the given name ==
- Andrey (footballer, born 1983), Andrey Nazário Afonso, goalkeeper for Avenida
- Andrey (footballer, born 1993), Andrey da Silva Ventura, goalkeeper for Sampaio Corrêa
- Andrey (footballer, born 1996), Andrey Falinski Rodrigues, midfielder for Betim Futebol
- Andrey (footballer, born 2004), Andrey Nascimento dos Santos, midfielder for Chelsea
- Andrey (footballer, born February 1998), Andrey Ramos do Nascimento, midfielder for Coritiba
- Andrey (footballer, born November 1998), Andrey Marcos Andrade Pereira, midfielder for Los Cabos United
- Andrey Amador, Costa Rican cyclist
- Andrey Arshavin, Russian football player
- Andrey Belousov (born 1959), Russian politician
- Andrey Bolotov, Russian agriculturalist and memoirist
- Andrey Borodin, Russian financial expert and businessman
- Andrey Ershov, Russian computer scientist
- Andrey Esionov, Russian painter
- Andrey Esipenko, Russian chess grandmaster
- Andrey Ivanov, several people
- Andrey Kolmogorov, Russian mathematician
- Andrey Korotayev, Russian anthropologist
- Andrey Markov, Russian mathematician
- Andrey Osterman, Russian statesman
- Andrey Pantev (born 1939), Bulgarian historian
- Andrey Rublev (tennis), Russian tennis player
- Andrey Vlasov, Russian general
- Andrey Vlasov (footballer), Russian former football player
- Andrey Voznesensky, Russian writer
- Andrey Vyshinsky, Soviet politician
- Andrey X, Russian-Israeli journalist and activist
- Andrey Yankulov (born 1980), Bulgarian politician

== See also ==
- Andrei
- Andrei (surname), a surname
- Andrej
- Andriy
- Andrzej
- Ondrej
- Ondřej
