= Andrei =

- Pronunciation: Romanian: [anˈdrej] Russian: [ɐnˈdrʲej] Belarusian: [anˈdrɛj]
- Gender: Male
- Language: Slavic languages, Romanian
- Name day: November 30

Origin
- Region of origin: Eastern European, particularly Romania

Other names
- Variant forms: Andrey, Andrej, Andrw
- Related names: Andrew, Andreas, Andre, Ander, Anders, Andy, Andrejs, Andrzej, Andriy, Andrea, Andrés

Andrei, Andrey, or Andrej (in Cyrillic script: Андрэй, Андрей, or Андреј) is a form of Andreas/Ἀνδρέας in Slavic languages and Romanian. People with the name include:

- Andrei of Polotsk (c. 1325–1399), Lithuanian nobleman
- Andrei Broder (born 1953), Romanian-Israeli American computer scientist and engineer
- Andrei Chikatilo (1936–1994), prolific and cannibalistic Russian serial killer and rapist
- Andrei Denisov (weightlifter) (born 1963), Israeli Olympic weightlifter
- Andrei Glavina (1881–1925), Istro-Romanian writer and politician
- Andrei Gromyko (1909–1989), Belarusian Soviet politician and diplomat
- Andrei Iosivas (born 1999), American football player
- Andrei Karlov (1954–2016), Russian diplomat
- Andrei Kanchelskis (born 1959), retired Russian football player
- Andrei Khmel (born 1983), Belarusian politician
- Andrei Kirilenko (basketball) (born 1981), Russian basketball player in the NBA
- Andrei Kirilenko (politician) (1906–1990), Russian Soviet politician
- Andrei Kostitsyn (born 1985), Belarusian hockey player
- Andrei Lupan (1912–1992), Moldovan writer
- Andrei Angouw (born 1971), Indonesian politician and the incumbent mayor of Manado in North Sulawesi
- Andrei Markov (born 1978), Russian ice hockey player
- Andrei Maslovskiy (born 1982), Russian football player
- Andrei Mironov (1941–1987), Soviet and Russian stage and film actor
- Andrei Mozalev (born 2003), Russian figure skater
- Andrei Mureșanu (1816–1863), Romanian poet and revolutionary
- Andrei Netto, Brazilian journalist and writer
- Andrei Platonov (1899–1951), Russian-born writer of the Soviet period
- Andrei Rațiu (born 1998) Romanian footballer
- Andrei Rodrigues, Brazilian federal police delegate
- Andrei Rublev, Russian painter
- Andrei Sakharov (1921–1989), Russian physicist and activist, recipient of the Nobel Peace Prize
- Andrei Tarkovsky (1932–1986), Russian film director
- Andrei Ursu (born 1993), previously known as Wrs, Romanian singer and dancer
- Andrei Vasilevski (born 1991), Belarusian tennis player
- Andrei Zhdanov (1896–1948), Russian politician
- Andrei Zhelyabov (1851–1881), Russian revolutionary
- Andrei Zlătescu (1966-2017), Romanian academic

== See also ==
- Andrei (surname)
- Andrey
- Andrej
- Andriy
- Andrzej
- Ondrej
- Ondřej
