= Andros (name) =

- Gender: Male

Origin
- Origin: Andreas
- Region of origin: Greece

Other names
- Related names: Andrew, André, Ander, Andrei, Anders, Andreas, Andy, Andrés

Andros (Greek: Άνδρος) is a masculine given name. It can also be a surname. Notable people with the name include:

== Given name ==
- Andros Antoniadis (born 1939), Cypriot footballer
- Andros Christofi (born 1969), Cypriot football goalkeeper
- Andros Kyprianou (born 1955), Cypriot politician
- Andros Rodriguez, American music producer
- Andros Townsend (born 1991), English footballer

== Fictional characters ==
- Andros (Power Rangers), from the television series Power Rangers: In Space
- Andros Stark, a Marvel Comics character

== Surname ==
- Dee Andros (1924–2003), American football player, coach, and college athletics administrator
- Sir Edmund Andros (1637–1714), English colonial administrator
- Phil Andros, a pen name of Samuel Steward (1909–1993), American author
- Plato Andros (1921–2008), American football player
- Thomas Andros (born 1759), American clergyman
