= Andriy =

- Pronunciation: Ukrainian: [ɐnˈd⁽ʲ⁾r⁽ʲ⁾ij]
- Gender: Male
- Language: Ukrainian

Origin
- Language: Greek
- Meaning: "manly", "strong"
- Region of origin: Greece

Other names
- See also: Andy, Andrei, Andrea, Andreas, Andreou, Andrey, André, Andrzej, Andrés, Drew

Andriy or Andrii (Ukrainian: Андрі́й) is the Ukrainian form of the masculine English given name Andrew.

== Given name ==
People with this name include

- Andrii Artemenko, politician
- Andriy Antonenko, musician and soldier
- Andrii Bratashchuk, cyclist
- Andrii Demchuk, fencer
- Andrii Deshchytsia, ambassador
- Andriy Diachkov, volleyball player
- Andrii Goncharuk, diplomat
- Andrii Portnov, historian
- Andrij Dobriansky, singer
- Andrij Parekh, cinematographer
- Andriy Atanasovych Melnyk, nationalist leader
- Andriy Bachynskyi, Ruthenian Catholic Bishop of Mukacheve
- Andriy Bednyakov, TV presenter
- Andriy Bohdan, lawyer
- Andriy Bondarenko, pianist
- Andriy Danylko, pop and dance singer
- Andriy Deryzemlya, biathlete
- Andriy Grechylo, historian
- Andriy Ishchak, priest and martyr
- Andriy Ivanov, communist leader
- Andriy Khvetkevych, freediver
- Andriy Kobolyev, Naftogaz CEO
- Andriy Kozhemiakin (born 1965), Ukrainian politician and former security service officer
- Andriy Kravchenko, racecar driver
- Andriy Kutsenko, cyclist
- Andriy Kuzmenko, singer
- Andriy Kviatkovskyi, wrestler
- Andriy Lunin, goalkeeper
- Andriy Lyubka, poet
- Andriy Malyshko, writer
- Andriy Mandziy, luger
- Andriy Matviyevych Bobyr, artist
- Andriy Parubiy, politician
- Andriy Portnov, lawyer and politician
- Andriy Protsenko, high jumper
- Andriy Pyatov, goalkeeper
- Andriy Pyvovarsky, minister
- Andriy Rabiy, bishop
- Andriy Rudenko, professional boxer
- Andriy Rusol, footballer
- Andriy Sadovyi, mayor of Lviv
- Andriy Senchenko, politician and activist
- Andriy Shevchenko (politician)
- Andriy Shevchenko, football player
- Andriy Taran, minister of defence
- Andriy Tsaplienko, journalist
- Andriy Tverdostup, sprinter
- Andriy Vorobey, footballer
- Andriy Voronin, professional football manager
- Andriy Yahodka, fencer
- Andriy Yarmolenko, footballer
- Andriy Yaroslavovych Melnyk, ambassador
- Andrii Yermak, lawyer
- Andriy Zahorodniuk, politician
- Andriy Zhyltsov, athlete

== See also ==
- Ukrainian name
- Andrei, a Russian name
- Andrzej, a Polish name
- Andrey Sheptytsky, Metropolitan Galicia, Archbishop of Lviv (Lemberg)
- Andriychuk
- Andreychuk
- Andrija
- Andriyivskyy Descent
- Andriivka, Ivankiv Raion
- Andriivka, Mashivka Raion
- Andrei (surname), a surname
- Andrej
- Ondrej
- Ondřej
