= Ondráček =

Ondráček (feminine Ondráčková) is a Czech surname derived from the given name Ondra, a diminutive for the name Ondřej. Notable people include:

- Jiří Ondráček (1988), Czech ice hockey player
- Michal Ondráček (1973), Czech footballer

== See also ==
- Vondráček, another variant of this surname
- Section Andrew § Andrew-surname contains similar Czech surnames
