= Androsov =

Androsov (feminine: Androsova) is a surname. Notable people with the surname include:

- Gennady Androsov (1939–2016), Ukrainian swimmer
- Kirill Androsov (born 1972), Russian businessman
- Mariya Androsova-Ionova
- Natalia Androsova
- Pavel Androsov (1954–2025), Russian military officer
- Sergei Androsov (born 1986), Russian footballer

== See also ==
- Andrew § East Slavic surnames
