= Andrejić =

Origin
- Language: Serbo-Croatian
- Meaning: patronymic of Andrej

Andrejić is a Serbian surname derived from the name Andrej. Notable people with the surname include:

- Aleksa Andrejić (born 1993), Serbian professional footballer
- Petar Andrejić (born 1972), Serbian politician
- Simona Andrejić (born 1994), Serbian fashion model

== See also ==
- Andrew § South Slavic surnames
