= Andrej =

- Gender: Male
- Language: Slovak; Croatian; Slovene
- Name day: 30 November

Origin
- Origin: Greek for "man"
- Meaning: Andrew
- Region of origin: Greece

Other names
- Related names: Andrija, Andro, Andrew, Andrei, Andrejs, Andriy, Andrey, Ander, Anders, Andre, Andrea, Andreas, Andrés, Andreu, Jędrzej, Andrzej

Andrej is the form of the given name Andrew used in Slovak, Croatian and Slovene.

Notable individuals with the given name include:

- Andrej Babiš (born 1954), Czech politician
- Andrej Bajuk (1943–2011), Slovene politician and economist
- Andrej Čadež (born 1942), Slovene physicist and astrophysicist
- Andrej Karpathy (born 1986), Slovak-Canadian computer scientist
- Andrej Kiska (born 1963), Slovak politician and businessman
- Andrej Kramarić (born 1991), Croatian football player
- Andrej Meszároš (born 1985), Slovak ice hockey player
- Andrej Plenković (born 1970), Croatian politician
- Andrej Pohar (born 1974), Slovenian badminton player
- Andrej Sekera (born 1986), Slovak hockey player
- Andrej Stančík (born 1995), Slovak politician
- Andrej Stojaković (born 2004), Serbian–Greek basketball player

== See also ==
- Andrei (surname), a surname
- Andrei
- Andriy
- Andrzej
- Ondrej
- Ondřej
