= Ondrášek =

Ondrášek (feminine: Ondrášková) is a Czech surname derived from a diminutive of the given name Ondřej, which is a Czech variant of Andrew. Notable people with the surname include:

- Zdeněk Ondrášek (born 1988), Czech footballer
- Zuzana Ondrášková (born 1980), Czech tennis player

== See also ==
- Section Andrew § Andrew-surname contains similar Czech surnames
