= Andreychuk =

Andriychuk
Origin
- Language: Ukrainian
- Meaning: It derived from a given name Andriy

Other names
- Variant forms: Andriyenko, Andrushyn

Andreychuk, Andriychuk, Andriichuk, Andreichuk, or Andrachuk (Ukrainian: Андрійчу́к, Russian: Андрейчук) is a Ukrainian surname meaning Andrew's son, and may refer to:

- Andriy Andreychuk (born 2003), Ukrainian footballer
- Dave Andreychuk (born 1963), Canadian professional ice hockey player
- Peter Andreychuk (1892–1937), Ukrainian Catholic layman
- Raynell Andreychuk (born 1944), Canadian Senator
- Yuliya Andriychuk (born 1992), Ukrainian handball player

== See also ==
- Dave Andreychuk Mountain Arena & Skating Centre, Hamilton, Ontario
