= Fritz Anders =

Fritz Anders may refer to:

- Fritz Anders (aviator) (1889–1919), German World War I flying ace
- Fritz Anders (geneticist) (1919–1999), German geneticist and molecular biologist
