= Andreu =

Andreu (Eastern Catalan: [ənˈdɾew]) is a common Catalan, Spanish (Castilian), German and southern French given name of Ancient Greek origin, which also appears as a surname. The word Andreu is derived etymologically from the ancient Greek vocabulary word andros, the genitive of aner ("man") and so means "of the man". Thus, the name Andreu takes the meaning the one who is "manly", "strong", "courageous" or a "warrior". The contemporary Greek equivalent of the name is Andreou; the English equivalent is Andrew.

Notable people with the name include:

== Given name ==
- Andreu Blanes (born 1991), Spanish orienteering competitor
- Andreu Buenafuente (born 1965), Spanish late night show host and founder of the group El Terrat
- Andreu Canals (born 1973), Spanish rower
- Andreu Febrer (1375–1440), Catalan poet and diplomat
- Andreu Fontàs (born 1989), Catalan football player for the FC Barcelona
- Andreu Guerao (born 1983), Spanish footballer
- Andreu Ivars (1885–1936), Valencian Franciscan priest and historian
- Andreu Jacob (born 1971), Catalan composer
- Andreu Lacondeguy (born 1989), Catalan freeride Mountain biker
- Andreu Linares (born 1975), Spanish futsal player
- Andreu Martín (born 1949), Spanish author
- Andreu Mas-Colell (born 1944), Catalan economist
- Andreu Matos (born 1995), Andorran footballer
- Andreu Nin (1892–1937), Spanish politician
- Andreu Veà Baró (born 1969), Catalan Internet Pioneer; The Internet Biographer
- Andreu Vivó (1978–2012), Spanish male artistic gymnast

== Surname ==
- Anna Andreu (born 1988), Spanish singer, guitarist and composer
- Antonio Andreu (1947–2003), Spanish handballer
- Blanca Andreu (born 1959), Spanish poet
- Christian Andreu (born 1976), French musician
- Concha Andreu (born 1967), Spanish oenologist and politician
- Enrique Andreu (born 1967), Spanish basketball player
- Etelvina Andreu (born 1969), Spanish politician
- Fernando Andreu, Spanish judge
- Frankie Andreu (born 1966), American cyclist
- Gabriela Velasco Andreu (born 1985), Spanish tennis player
- Gogó Andreu (1919–2012), Argentine actor, comedian, and musician
- Guillemette Andreu (born 1948), French Egyptologist and archaeologist
- Juan Alberto Andreu (born 1984), a Spanish football/soccer player
- Juan Andreu (born 1985), Spanish handballer
- Maite Andreu (born 1971), Spanish handballer
- Marc Andreu (born 1985), French rugby union player
- Maria Andreu (1801–?), first US Coastguard female employee
- Mariano Andreu (1888–1976), Spanish painter
- Marta Vilajosana Andreu (born 1975), Spanish road bicycle racer
- Paul Andreu (1938–2018), French architect
- Pedro Andreu, Spanish musician
- Pierre Andreu (1909–1987), French journalist, essayist, biographer, and poet
- Reineri Andreu (born 1998), Cuban freestyle wrestler
- Rosaura Andreu (1922–2010), Cuban actress
- Simón Andreu (born 1941), Spanish actor
- Tono Andreu (1915–1981), Argentine film actor
- Tony Andreu (born 1988), French footballer
- Vanessa Andreu (born 1979), Mexican actress, singer, hostess, and reporter
- Yoann Andreu (born 1989), French footballer

== See also ==
- Andrzej
- Jędrzej
- Sant Andreu
