= Andrejus =

Andrejus or Andrėjus is a Lithuanian masculine given name, an equivalent of Andrey/Andrew. Notable people with the name include:

- Andrejus Olijnikas, Lithuanian canoeist
- Andrėjus Tereškinas, Lithuanian professional footballer
- Andrejus Zadneprovskis, Lithuanian modern pentathlete

== See also ==
- Andrew#Variants by language
