= Vondráček =

Vondráček (feminine: Vondráčková) is a Czech surname derived from the given name Vondra, a diminutive for the name Ondřej. It may refer to:

== Vondráček ==
- Jan Vondráček (born 1966), Czech actor
- Libor Vondráček (born 1994), Czech politician
- Lukáš Vondráček
- Petr Vondráček (born 1977), Czech kickboxer
- Radek Vondráček (born 1973), Czech politician
- Roman Vondráček, (born 1984), Czech ice hockey player
- Tomáš Vondráček
- Vladimír Vondráček (1895–1978), Czech psychiatrist
- Vladimír Vondráček (cyclist)
- Zoran Vondraček

== Vondráčková ==
- Helena Vondráčková (born 1947), Czech singer
- Lucie Vondráčková (born 1980), Czech singer and actress

== See also ==
- Wolf Wondratschek, German writer
- 17251 Vondracek, a main belt asteroid
- Section Andrew § Andrew-surname contains similar Czech surnames
