= Ondráš =

Ondráš is a surname derived from a diminutive for the given name Ondrej. Notable people with the surname include:

- Charlie Ondras
- Marcel Ondráš

== See also ==
- Section Andrew § Andrew-surname contains similar Czech surnames
