= Androić =

Androić (pronounced [ǎndroitɕ]) is a Croatian surname. The surname is mostly concentrated in the vicinity of Zlatar, Croatia, though most Androić of the past hundred years were born in Petrova Gora near Lepoglava, where every twentieth resident had the Androić surname. Today in Croatia, there are about 400 people named Androić in around 130 households. In the middle of the last century, there were about 300 people. The two principal migrations of Androićs in the last century were from Lobor to the cities of Varaždin and Zagreb.

It may refer to:

- Mirko Androić (1922–1982), Croatian historian and archivist
- Toni Androić (born 1991), Croatian tennis player
- Miljenka Androić (born 1954), Croatian actress
- Vladimir Androić (born 1957), Serbian basketball coach and former player

== See also ==
- Andrew § South Slavic surnames
