= Onderka =

Onderka (feminine: Onderková) is a Czech surname, derived from a diminutive for the given name Ondřej. Notable people with the surname include:

- Radek Onderka (born 20 September 1973) is a Czech former footballer
- Roman Onderka (born 11 November 1965 in Brno) is a Czech politician

== See also ==
- Section Andrew § Andrew-surname contains similar Czech surnames
