= Andrejević =

Andrejević (Serbian Cyrillic: Андрејевић) is a Serbian surname derived from the name Andrej. Notable people with the surname include:

- Aleksandar Andrejević (born 1991), Serbian basketball player
- Aleksandar Andrejević (born 1992), Serbian football player
- Đorđe Andrejević-Kun (1904–1964), Serbian painter
- Jovan Andrejević-Joles (fl. 1860s), first Serbian anatomist and one of the founding fathers of Serbian National Theatre
- Milet Andrejevic (1925–1989), Yugoslav born American painter
- Sima Andrejević (1804–1882), Serbian merchant

== See also ==
- Andrew § South Slavic surnames
