= Ondrejka =

Ondrejka (Czech feminine: Ondrejková) is a surname derived from a diminutive for the given name Ondrej, Andrew. Notable people with the surname include:

- Cory Ondrejka
- Jacob Ondrejka
- Martin Ondrejka
- Jozef Ondrejka

== See also ==
- Section Andrew § Andrew-surname contains similar Czech surnames
