= Vonášek =

Vonášek, female Vonášková is a Czech surname. Notable people with the surname include:

- Roman Vonášek (born 1968), Czech footballer
- Václav Vonášek (born 1980), Czech bassoonist

== See also ==
- Section Andrew § Andrew-surname contains similar Czech surnames
