= Andraž =

Andraž is a Slovenian masculine given name, an equivalent of Andrew. Notable people with the name include:

- Andraž Jereb
- Andraž Kirm
- Andraž Krapež
- Andraž Lipolt
- Andraž Pograjc
- Andraž Struna
- Andraž Vehovar
- Andraž Šporar
- Andraž Žinič
- Andraž Žurej

== See also ==
- Andrew#Variants by language
