= Andrusov =

Andrusov (feminine: Andrusova) is a Russian surname. Notable people with the surname include:

- Dimitrij Andrusov (1897–1976), Slovak geologist
- Nicolai Ivanovich Andrusov (1861–1924), Russian geologist, stratigrapher, and paleontologist
  - Dorsa Andrusov, a wrinkle ridge system on the Moon

== See also ==
- Andrew § East Slavic surnames
