= Andrienko =

Andrienko, Andriienko, Andriyenko (Ukrainian: Андрієнко, Russian: Андриенко, romanized: Andreenko / Andreyenko, Belarusian: Andreenka / Andreyenka) is a patronymic surname of Ukrainian origins, derived from the given name Andriy, or 'Andrew'.

Notable people with the surname include:

- Aleksandr Andrienko (born 1990), Russian alpine skier
- Denys Andriyenko (born 1980), Ukrainian footballer
- Mykhailo Andriienko-Nechytailo (1894–1982), Ukrainian painter
- Natalia Andrienko, Russian computer scientist
- Tetiana Andriienko (1938–2016) Ukrainian botanist
- Yelena Andrienko (born 1972), Russian ballet dancer
