= Vonka =

Vonka (feminine: Vonková) is a Czech surname, derived from a diminutive for the given name Ondřej. Notable people with the surname include:

- Jan Vonka (born 1963), Czech auto racing driver
- Vladimír Vonka (1930–2025), Czech virologist

== See also ==
- Wonka (disambiguation)
