= Vondrák =

Vondrák is a Czech surname. Notable people with the surname include:

- Clint Vondrak (born 1989), American professional baseball umpire
- Ivo Vondrák (born 1959), Czech professor and politician
- Jan Vondrák, Czech mathematician
- Václav Vondrák (1859–1925), Czech Slavist

== See also ==
- 35356 Vondrák, a main belt asteroid named after Jan Vondrák
- Section Andrew § Andrew-surname contains similar Czech surnames
