= Andrijević =

Andrijević, sometimes spelled Andrijevic, is a surname. Notable people with the surname include:

- Stanko Andrijević (1841–1894), Mayor of Zagreb
- Berislav Andrijević (1936–2021), Croatian economist
- Nikola Andrijevic (born 1969), Canadian footballer

== See also ==
- Andrew § South Slavic surnames
