= Povondra =

Povondra (feminine: Povondrová) is a Czech language patronymic surname: it is interpreted as "syn po Vondrovi" i.e., "son of Vondra". It may refer to:

- Pavel Povondra, Czech mineralogist, the namesake of povondraite
- Tomáš Josef Povondra (1786–1832), rector (1820) of the Olomouc Liceum (now Palacký University of Olomouc)

== Fictional characters ==
- František Povondra, major character from the War with the Newts science fiction novel by Karel Čapek
