= Andreou =

Andreou (Greek: Ανδρέου [an̪ˈðre̞u]), also spelt Antreou, is a common surname in Greece and Cyprus. It originally meant son of Andrew or son of Andreas. Andreou or Andreu is also a last name in Spain and Italy. Andreou is of pre-Christian Greek origin although in Western Europe it gained popularity during the Crusades (mostly in the form of Andrew) and was also one of the earliest settler names in America.

Andreou may refer to:

- Anastasios Andreou (1877–1947), Greek-Cypriot athlete who competed in the 1896 Summer Olympics in Athens
- Charalambos Andreou (born 1967), Greek-Cypriot footballer
- Constantine Andreou (1917–2007), Légion d'honneur awarded painter & sculptor of Greek origin
- Christos Andreou (born 1994), Greek-Cypriot film composer
- Ioannis Andreou, Greek swimmer that participated in the 1896 Summer Olympics in Athens
- Marios Andreou (born 1998), Cypriot footballer
- Sozos Andreou (born 1969), Greek-Cypriot footballer
