= Andreina =

Andreína is a female name of Italian and Spanish origin, given in the Spanish speaking country of Venezuela, and can refer to:

- Andreína Álvarez (born 1979), Venezuelan actress, entertainer, comedian, and acting teacher
- Andreína Castro, winner of the Teen Model Venezuela 2007 pageant
- Andreína Gomes,
- Andreína Martínez (born 1997), Dominican–American model and beauty queen who was crowned Miss Dominican Republic 2021
- Andreína Mujica (born 1970), Venezuelan journalist and photographer.
- Andreina Pagnani, Italian actress and voice actress
- Andreina Pinto, Venezuelan Olympic swimmer
- Andreína Prieto, representative of Venezuela to the Miss World 2001 pageant
- Andreína Tarazón (born 1988), Venezuelan politician
- Andreina Yépez(1974–2026), Venezuelan actress
