= Ondříček =

Ondříček (feminine Ondříčková) is a Czech surname. Notable people include:

- David Ondříček, Czech film director
- František Ondříček, Czech violinist and composer
- Karel Ondříček, Czech violinist
- Miroslav Ondříček, Czech cinematographer

== See also ==
- Section Andrew § Andrew-surname contains similar Czech surnames
