= Andreychin =

Andreychin or Andreichin (Bulgarian: Андрейчин) is a patronymic Bulgarian surname. Notable people with the surname include:

- Georgi Andreychin (1894–1950), Bulgarian activist
- Ivan Andreychin (1872–1934), Bulgarian poet and translator
- Lyubomir Andreychin (1910–1975), Bulgarian linguist
