= Andris =

Male given name

- Gender: Male
- Name day: 30 November

Origin
- Region of origin: Latvia

Other names
- Related names: Andrejs

Andris is a Latvian masculine given name, a cognate of Andrew, and may refer to:

- Andris Ambainis (born 1975), Latvian computer scientist
- Andris Ameriks (born 1961) Latvian politician and economist
- Andris Andreiko (1942–1976), Latvian world champion and European champion Draughts player
- Andris Ārgalis (born 1944), Latvian politician
- Andris Bērziņš (born 1944), Latvian politician, former President of Latvia
- Andris Bērziņš (born 1951), Latvian politician, former Prime Minister of Latvia
- Andris Biedriņš (born 1986), Latvian basketball player
- Andris Blicavs (born 1954), Australian basketball player
- Andris Džeriņš (born 1988), Latvian ice hockey player
- Andris Hernández (born 1982), Venezuelan track and road racing cyclist
- Andris Keišs (born 1974), Latvian stage and film actor
- Andris Kulbergs (born 1979), Latvian politician, prime minister of Latvia (2026–)
- Andris Lapsa (born 1968), Latvian footballer
- Andris Liepa (born 1962), Latvian ballet dancer
- Andris Misters (born 1992), Latvian basketball player
- Andris Naudužs (born 1975), Latvian racing cyclist and Olympic competitor
- Andris Nelsons (born 1978), Latvian conductor
- Andris Ozols (born 1968), Latvian businessman and government official
- Andris Piebalgs (born 1957), Latvian politician and diplomat
- Andris Poga (born 1980), Latvian conductor
- Andris Reinholds (born 1971), Latvian rower
- Andris Reiss (born 1978), Latvian cyclist and Olympic competitor
- Andris Šics (born 1985), Latvian luger and Olympic medalist
- Andris Siksnis (born 1993), Latvian ice hockey player
- Andris Šķēle (born 1958), Latvian politician, businessman, former Prime Minister of Latvia
- Andris Smirnovs (born 1990), Latvian cyclist
- Andris Teikmanis (born 1959), Latvian jurist, politician, diplomat and former Mayor of Riga
- Andris Treimanis (born 1985), Latvian football referee
- Andris Vaņins (born 1980), Latvian football goalkeeper
- Andris Vilks (1963–2024), Latvian politician
- Andris Vosekalns (born 1992), Latvian road cyclist
