= Andrey Ivanov =

Andrei or Andrey Ivanov may refer to:

== Footballers ==
- Andrei Ivanov (footballer, 1967-2009), Soviet football defender
- Andrei Ivanov (footballer, born 1988), Russian football left-back
- Andrei Ivanov (footballer, born 1994), Russian football defender

== Others ==
- Andrei Ivanov (Bolshevik) (born 1888), Soviet politician
- Andrei Ivanov (ice hockey) (born 1981), Russian ice hockey player
- Andrey Ivanov (swimmer) (born 1976), Russian swimmer
- Andrey Ivanov (skier) (born 1973), Russian Olympic skier
- Andrei Ivanov (writer) (born 1971), Estonian-Russian writer
- Andrey Ivanov (painter) (1775-1848), Russian painter
- Nader Sufyan Abbas, Qatari-Bulgarian weightlifter, born as Andrey Ivanov
- Andrei Ivanov (badminton) (born 1987), Russian badminton player
