= Vondruška =

Vondruška is a Czech surname. Notable people with the surname include:

- Pavel Vondruška (1925–2011), Czech actor and musician
- Rostislav Vondruška (born 1961), Czech politician
- Zdeňka Bezděková née Vondrušková

== See also ==
- Section Andrew § Andrew-surname contains similar Czech surnames
