= Andréia =

- Gender: Female
- Language: Portuguese

Origin
- Origin: Greek

Other names
- Alternative spelling: Andreia
- Related names: Andrea

Andréia (or Andreia) is a Portuguese feminine given name. For the ancient Greek term ἀνδρεία or andreia, see Courage.

Notable people named Andréia or Andreia include:

== People ==
- Andreia Aparecida Hessel (born 1984), Brazilian marathon runner
- Andreia Bandeira (born 1987), Brazilian amateur boxer
- Andréia de Olicar (1976–2020), Brazilian singer and composer
- Andréia dos Santos (born 1977), Brazilian women's football player
- Andreia Faria (born 2000), Portuguese footballer
- Andréia Horta (born 1983), Brazilian actress
- Andreia Jacinto (born 2002), Portuguese footballer
- Andréia Laurence (born 1983), Brazilian volleyball player
- Andreia Marras (born 1971), Brazilian volleyball player
- Andreia Norton (born 1996), Portuguese footballer
- Andréia Rosa de Andrade (born 1984), Brazilian football defender
- Andréia Sadi (born 1987), Brazilian journalist
- Andréia Suntaque (born 1977), Brazilian goalkeeper

== Fictional characters ==
- Andréia Bijou, a character from Duas Caras
