= Andrei Maslovskiy =

Russian footballer

Personal information
- Full name: Andrei Ivanovich Maslovskiy
- Date of birth: 24 June 1982 (age 44)
- Place of birth: Rostov-on-Don, Russian SFSR, Soviet Union
- Height: 1.76 m (5 ft 9 1/2 in)
- Positions: Midfielder; defender

Youth career
- RO UOR Rostov-on-Don

Senior career*
Years	Team	Apps	(Gls)
1998–2000	FC Rostselmash-2 Rostov-on-Don	35	(1)
2001	FC Diana Otradovka		
2002	FC Rostovnefteprodukt Salsk		
2002	FC Mayak Rostov-on-Don		
2003	FC Progress Kamensk-Shakhtinsky (amateur)		
2003	FC Mir-Dongazdobycha Sulin		
2003–2004	FC Kavkaztransgaz Izobilny	44	(15)
2005	FC Alnas Almetyevsk	33	(3)
2006–2007	FC Nosta Novotroitsk	26	(0)
2008	FC Bataysk-2007	33	(8)
2009–2010	FC Dynamo Bryansk	39	(5)
2010	FC Sheksna Cherepovets	15	(1)
2011–2012	FC Avangard Kursk	56	(2)
2013	FC Dynamo Bryansk (amateur)		
2013–2014	FC Dynamo Bryansk	15	(0)
2015	FC Chayka Peschanokopskoye (amateur)		
- * Club domestic league appearances and goals

Andrei Ivanovich Maslovskiy (Russian: Андрей Иванович Масловский; born 24 June 1982) is a former Russian professional football player.

== Club career ==
He played 2 seasons in the Russian Football National League for FC Nosta Novotroitsk and FC Dynamo Bryansk.
