= Andrei Zlătescu =

Andrei Paul Zlătescu (born 12 May 1966, Bucureşti - d. 29 August 2017) was a member of the United Nations Human Rights Committee in 2014. He has also served as an assistant professor for universities including Western University.

== Professional Commitments ==
Zlătescu served as an assistant professor in Global studies with the Faculty of Information and Media Studies at Western University (2010–11), and as a Professor with Fanshawe College, in London, Ontario (2010–2013). 2013–2014, Academic Program Coordinator, European Inter-University Centre for Human Rights and Democratisation, Venice, European Master's of Human Rights and Democratisation Programme for Romania.

2013–2014, Academic Program Coordinator, European Inter-University Centre for Human Rights and Democratisation, Venice, European Master's of Human Rights and Democratisation Programme for Romania.

2013–2014, Professor (Associate), School of Doctoral Studies, Faculty of Political Science, University of Bucharest.

== Books and Monographs ==
- Prospero's Planet. Critical Quandaries around Shakespeare's Last Play (in English), 220 pages, Cultura Drepturilor Omului, Editura Publica, Bucharest, 2014.
- Shakespeare's The Tempest and The Elizabethan World, (in English), 267 pages, Cultura Drepturilor Omului, Editura Publica, Bucharest, 2014.
- 'The Tempest" as a Pretext: Shakespeare's Last Major Play and the New Allegories of Order, University of Alberta, 2008.
- Community Theory at Crossroads. Ecuador's Cultural Ecologies and Globalization." Prepared and prefaced an Interdisciplinary Course pack (750 pages), June 2010, University of Calgary.
