= Ander García =

Spanish basketball player

No. 4 – Union Dax-Gamarde
- Position: Shooting guard

Personal information
- Born: 5 April 1989 (age 37) Bergara, Spain
- Listed height: 1.92 m (6 ft 4 in)

Career information
- Playing career: 2007–present

Career history
- 2007–2008: Baskonia
- 2008–2009: Archena
- 2009–2010: Lucentum Alicante B
- 2010: Xuventude Cambados
- 2010–2011: Baskonia
- 2011–2012: Araberri
- 2012–2013: Natra Oñati
- 2013–2014: Xuventude Cambados
- 2014–2016: Zornotza
- 2016–2017: Iraurgi
- 2017–2018: Zornotza
- 2018–present: Union Dax-Gamarde

Ander García (born 5 April 1989) is a Spanish professional basketball player who played with Saski Baskonia.

== Career ==
On 27 January 2008, García made his debut in the Liga ACB with Baskonia. After a first year in Baskonia with very few minutes, he decided to leave the team for playing in lower divisions.

In April 2017, he helped Sammic ISB to achieve the title of the 2016–17 LEB Plata and to promote to the second division.
