= Sozos Andreou =

Cypriot footballer (born 1969)

Personal information
- Full name: Sozos Andreou
- Date of birth: September 6, 1969 (age 57)
- Place of birth: Famagusta, Cyprus
- Position: Defender

Senior career*
Years	Team	Apps	(Gls)
1992–1998	Anorthosis Famagusta	91	(5)
1998–2001	AEL Limassol	58	(1)
2001–2002	Alki Larnaca	11	(0)
Total		160	(6)

International career
1995–1997	Cyprus	4	(0)
- * Club domestic league appearances and goals

Sozos Andreou (Greek: Σώζος Ανδρέου; born September 6, 1969) is a Cypriot former international football defender.

He started his career in 1992 with Anorthosis Famagusta. He also played for AEL Limassol and Alki Larnaca.
