= Andros Antoniadis =

Cypriot footballer (born 1939)

Personal information
- Date of birth: 1939 (age 86–87)
- Position: Midfielder

International career
Years	Team	Apps	(Gls)
1963–1965	Cyprus	6	(0)

Andros Antoniadis (born 1939) is a Cypriot footballer. He played in six matches for the Cyprus national football team from 1963 to 1965.
