= Andrle =

Andrle (feminine: Andrlová) is a Czech surname. It originated as a German diminutive of the given name Andreas. Similar surnames with the same origin are Anderle and Andrýsek. Notable people with the surname include:

- Ivana Andrlová (born 1960), Czech actress
- René Andrle (born 1974), Czech road bicycle racer

== See also ==
- 8048 Andrle, a minor planet named after the Czech astronomer Pavel Andrle
