= Petar Andrejić =

Serbian politician

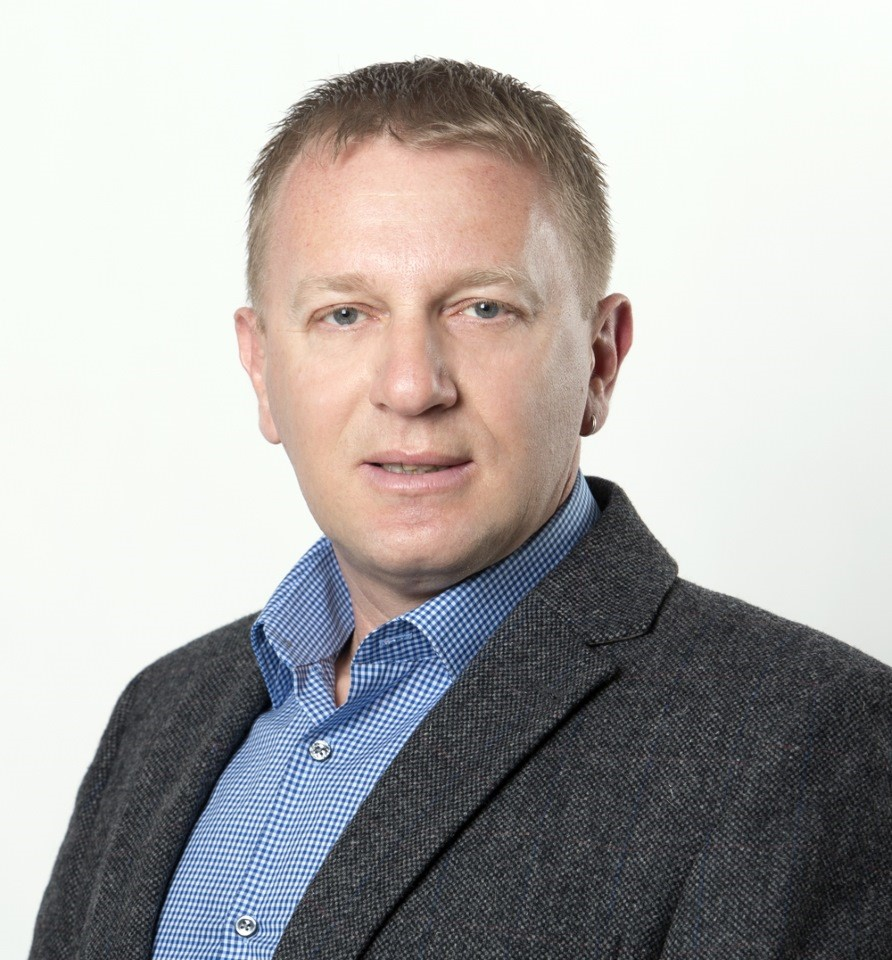

Petar Andrejić (Serbian Cyrillic: Петар Андрејић; born 1972) is a politician in Serbia. He served in the Assembly of Vojvodina from 2000 to 2016 as a member of the Democratic Party (Demokratska stranka, DS). Andrejić joined the Serbian Progressive Party (Srpska napredna stranka, SNS) in late 2016 and has served as president of the Starčevo community council.

== Private career ==
Andrejić has identified as a chemical technician and a journalist.

== Politician ==
Andrejić was a member of the Serbian National Renewal (Srpska narodna obnova, SNO) party in the early 1990s and appeared on its electoral lists for the Zrenjanin division in the 1992 and 1993 Serbian parliamentary elections. In both cases, the list failed to cross the electoral threshold for assembly representation. He subsequently left this party to join the DS.

=== Assembly of Vojvodina ===
Andrejić was first elected to the Vojvodina assembly in the 2000 provincial election, winning in Pančevo's seventh division. The DS contested this election as part of the Democratic Opposition of Serbia (Demokratska opozicija Srbije, DOS), which won a landslide victory, and Andrejić served as a supporter of the provincial government.

Vojvodina introduced a system of mixed proportional representation for the 2004 provincial election, and Andrejić was elected for Pančevo's redistributed second division. He was re-elected for the same district in 2008 and 2012. The DS was the dominant party in Vojvodina's provincial government throughout these years, and he continued to serve as a supporter of the administration. In his last term, he was a member of the information committee and the committee for determining the identity of provincial regulations in languages of official use.

Andrejić was also elected to the Pančevo city assembly in the 2000, 2004, 2008, and 2012 local elections. In 2000, he was elected for Starčevo's first division; after this election, Serbia introduced a system of full proportional representation at the local level.

=== Since 2016 ===
Andrejić left the DS in 2016 and contested the 2016 local election in Pančevo at the head of his own list, which did not cross the electoral threshold. He also led the Starčevo Movement group, which won a majority victory in elections for Starčevo's community council, and was named as the council's president. In a Politika article from August 2016, he argued for Starčevo becoming a separate municipality.

In December 2016, Andrejič led the Starčevo Movement into the Progressive Party.

== Electoral record ==
=== Provincial (Vojvodina) ===
2012 Vojvodina provincial election: Pančevo Division 2
Candidate	Party	First round		Second round	
Candidate	Party	Votes	%	Votes	%
Petar Andrejić (incumbent)	Choice for a Better Vojvodina–Bojan Pajtic (Affiliation: Democratic Party)	5,386	29.17	8,952	56.31
Jakša Balčaković	Let's Get Vojvodina Moving–Tomislav Nikolić (Serbian Progressive Party, New Serbia, Movement of Socialists, Strength of Serbia Movement)	3,479	18.84	6,946	43.69
Andrija Nišavić	Socialist Party of Serbia (SPS), Party of United Pensioners of Serbia (PUPS), United Serbia (JS), Social Democratic Party of Serbia (SDP Serbia)	2,256	12.22		
Miloš Pantović	Democratic Party of Serbia	2,050	11.10		
Radovanka Jakovljev Lazić	League of Social Democrats of Vojvodina–Nenad Čanak	1,423	7.71		
Nemanja Glavonić	Serbian Radical Party	1,091	5.91		
Dragan Higl	U-Turn	1,031	5.58		
Zoran Ranisavljev	Saša Pavlov–United for Pančevo–United Regions of Serbia	985	5.34		
Károly Rancz	Alliance of Vojvodina Hungarians	761	4.12		
Total		18,462	100.00	15,898	100.00

2008 Vojvodina provincial election: Pančevo Division 2
Candidate	Party	First round		Second round	
Candidate	Party	Votes	%	Votes	%
Petar Andrejić (incumbent)	For a European Vojvodina, Democratic Party–G17 Plus, Boris Tadić	7,010	33.46	5,456	63.89
Andrija Pavlović	Serbian Radical Party	4,458	21.28	3,084	36.11
Ivanka Barašević	Citizens' Group: Orange Block–Može	2,848	13.59		
Sanja Simić	Democratic Party of Serbia–New Serbia–Vojislav Koštunica	1,564	7.46		
Milan Ilić	Socialist Party of Serbia (SPS)–Party of United Pensioners of Serbia (PUPS)	1,337	6.38		
Goran Pavlov	Liberal Democratic Party	967	4.62		
Zoran Nedić	My Choice–On the Right Path	866	4.13		
Ivan Zafirović	Coalition of Greens	766	3.66		
Milan Kostić	Together for Vojvodina–Nenad Čanak	756	3.61		
Stevan Urošev	Vojvodina's Party	380	1.81		
Total		20,952	100.00	8,540	100.00
Valid votes		20,952	96.03	8,540	97.92
Invalid/blank votes		866	3.97	181	2.08
Total votes		21,818	100.00	8,721	100.00

2004 Vojvodina provincial election: Pančevo Division 2
Candidate	Party	First round		Second round	
Candidate	Party	Votes	%	Votes	%
Petar Andrejić (incumbent)	Democratic Party–Boris Tadić	2,650	25.20	5,111	61.30
Gordana Lakić	Serbian Radical Party	1,600	15.22	3,227	38.70
Dr. Zoran Nedić	My Pančevo	1,555	14.79		
Dr. Sava Stajić	Democratic Party of Serbia	1,380	13.13		
V. Đurica Jovanov	Socialist Party of Serbia	933	8.87		
Slavko Malidźan	Strength of Serbia Movement	800	7.61		
Vesna Filijović	Vojvodina Coalition	599	5.70		
Slaviša Sinđić	Together for Vojvodina–Nenad Čanak	570	5.42		
Vladimir Ćirić	G17 Plus	427	4.06		
Total		10,514	100.00	8,338	100.00
Valid votes		10,514	94.72	8,338	96.08
Invalid/blank votes		586	5.28	340	3.92
Total votes		11,100	100.00	8,678	100.00

2000 Vojvodina provincial election: Pančevo Division 2
Candidate	Party
Petar Andrejić (***WINNER***)	Democratic Opposition of Serbia–Vojislav Koštunica (Affiliation: Democratic Party)
Ilija Anđelković	Socialist Party of Serbia–Yugoslav Left–Slobodan Milošević
István Joná	Democratic Movement for Pančevo
Zsolt Nagy	Democratic Party of Vojvodina Hungarians–András Ágoston
Dr. Zoran Nedić (incumbent)	Citizens' Group
Ratko Milojević	Citizens' Group
Miloš Sredojević	Citizens' Group
Dr. Lidija Stamenić	Serbian Radical Party
Total

=== Local (City of Pančevo) ===
2000 Pančevo city election: Division 67 (Starčevo I)
Candidate	Party
Petar Andrejić (***WINNER***)	Democratic Opposition of Serbia–Vojislav Koštunica (Affiliation: Democratic Party)
Božidar Jotić	Democratic Movement for Pančevo
Ljiljana Kostić	Socialist Party of Serbia–Yugoslav Left–Slobodan Milošević
Lazar Markuš	Serbian Radical Party
Ratko Milojević	Citizens' Group
Miloš Sredojević	Citizens' Group
Miloš Simijonović	Serbian Renewal Movement
Vitomir Filipović Beli	Citizens' Group
Total
