= Andrei Ivanov (writer) =

Estonian-Russian writer (born 1971)

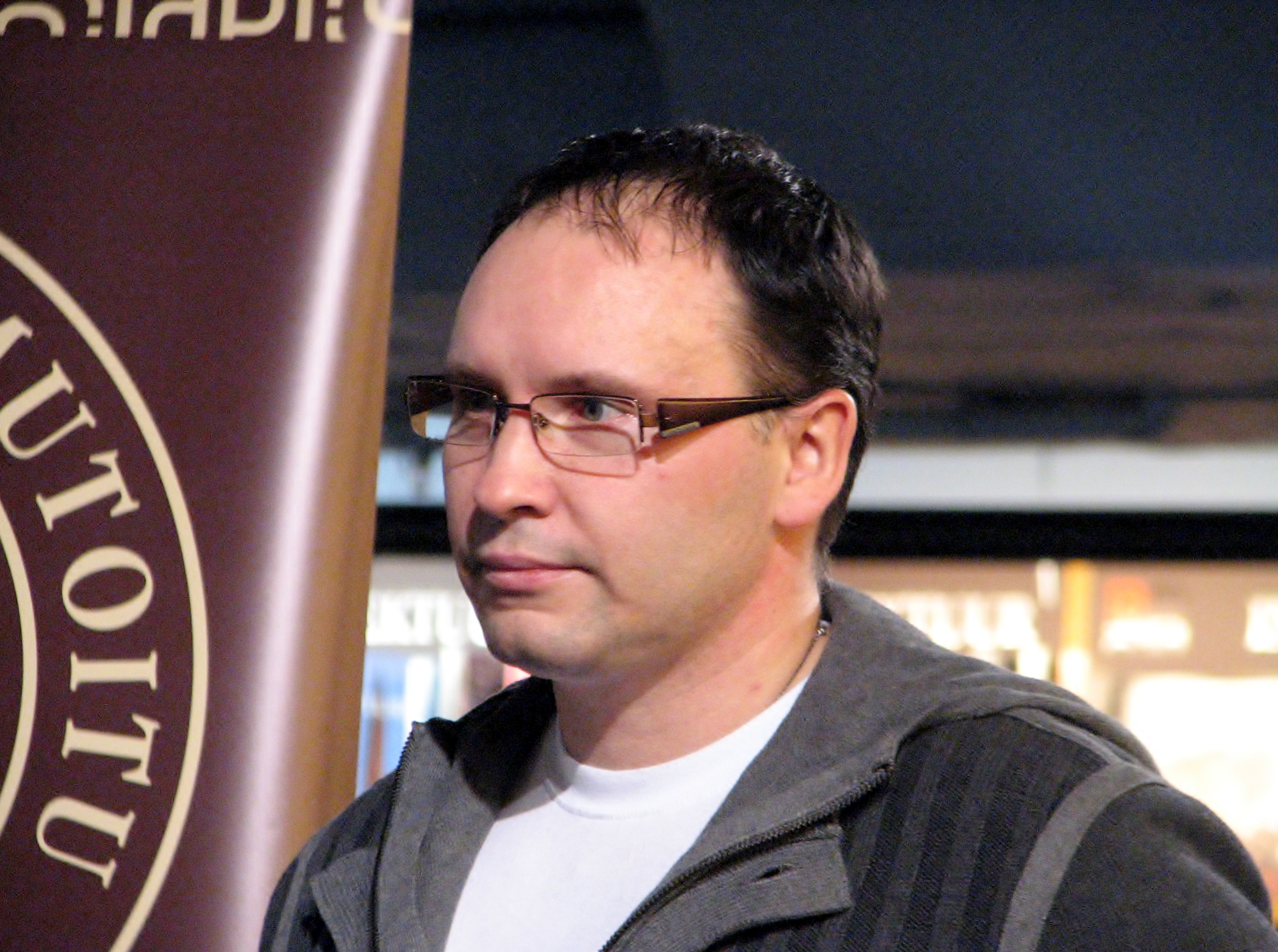
Andrei Ivanov (2014)

Andrei Ivanov (Russian: Андрей Вячеславович Иванов; born 24 December 1971, Tallinn) is an Estonian-Russian writer.

He graduated from Tallinn Pedagogical University, studying Russian philology. After graduating, he lived for many years in Scandinavia. At the beginning of the 2000s, he returned to Estonia. Since then, he is focused on writing. Since 2013 he is a member of Estonian Writers' Union.

== Works ==
- 2009: novel "Путeшествие Ханумана на Лолланд" ('Hanuman's Travels')
- 2011: short story collection: "Копенгага" ('Copenhagen')
- 2013: novel "Харбинские мотыльки" ('The Butterflies of Harbin')
- 2026: novel "Весна священна" ('Holy Spring')
