= Jędrzej Jędrych =

Polish politician (born 1967)

member of Sejm 2005-2007
- In office 25 September 2005 – ?

Personal details
- Born: 11 August 1967 (age 58)
- Party: Law and Justice

Jędrzej Jędrych (born 11 August 1967 in Kolbuszowa) is a Polish politician. He was elected to Sejm on 25 September 2005, getting 13791 votes in 29 Gliwice district as a candidate from Law and Justice list.

== See also ==
- Members of Polish Sejm 2005-2007
