= Andrýsek =

Andrýsek (feminine: Andrýsková) is a Czech surname, derived from the name Andreas. Similar surnames with the same origin are Andrle and Anderle. Notable people with the surname include:

- Franz Andrysek (1906–1981), Austrian weightlifter
- Veronika Andrýsková (born 1997), Czech handballer
