= Vondra =

Vondra (feminine: Vondrová) is a Czech surname, derived from a pet name for the given name Ondřej (a Czech variant of the name Andrew). Notable people with the surname include:

- Alexandr Vondra (born 1961), Czech politician and diplomat
- Jan Vondra (born 1995), Czech footballer
- Lada Vondrová (born 1999), Czech track and field athlete
- Martina Vondrová (born 1972), Czech cross-country skier
