= Andrii Portnov =

Ukrainian historian (born 1979)

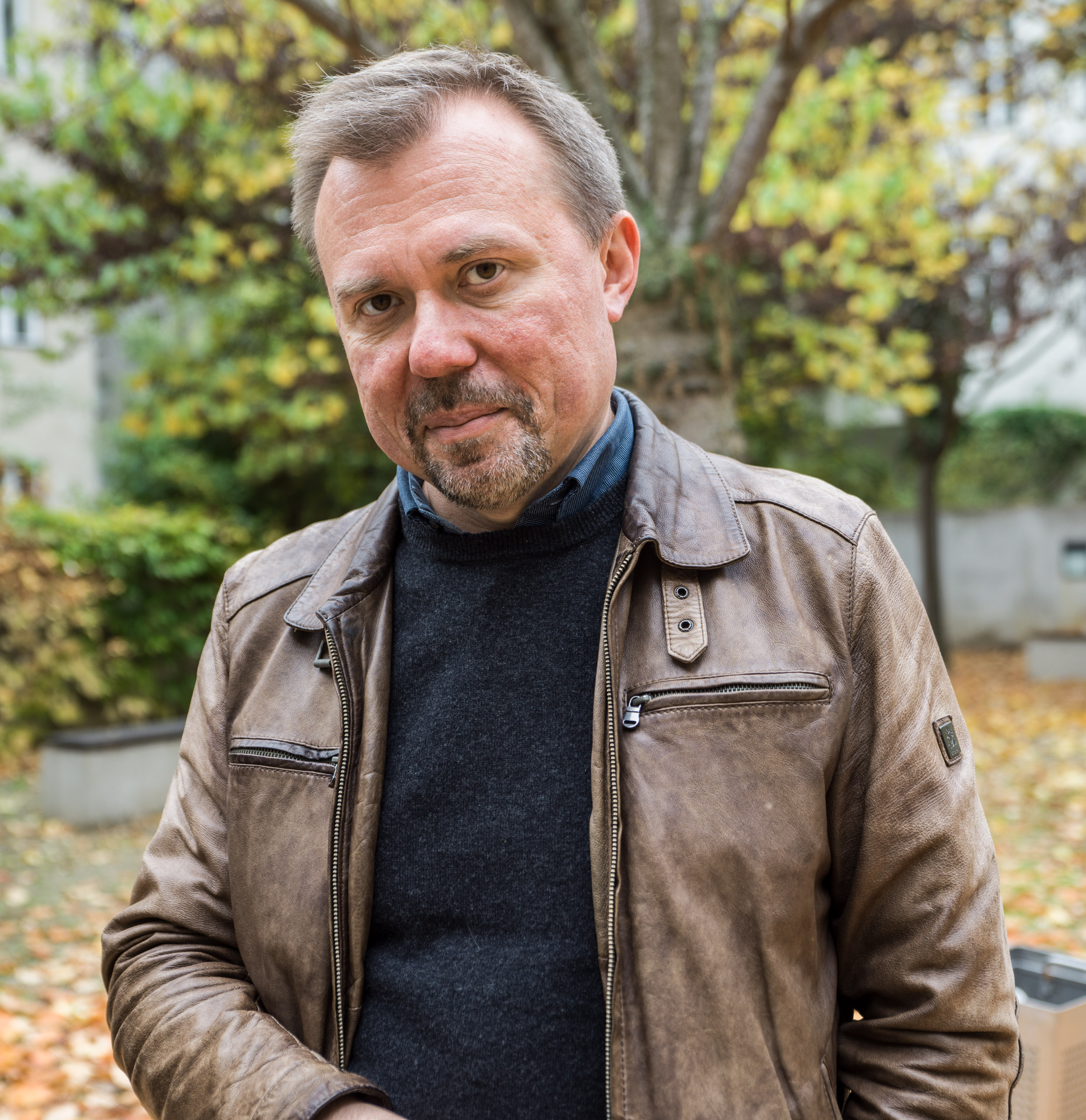
Andrii Portnov (October 2022)

Andrii Volodymyrovych Portnov (Ukrainian: Андрій Володимирович Портнов; born 17 May 1979) is a Ukrainian historian, essayist, and editor. In 2018–2025 he was the chair professor of entangled history of Ukraine at the European University Viadrina in Frankfurt (Oder).. Portnov is a director of the PRISMA UKRAЇNA Research Network Eastern Europe. He specializes in Polish-Russian-Ukrainian history and memory studies.

== Biography ==
Andrii Portnov was born on 17 May 1979 in Dnipro. He graduated from Dnipropetrovsk National University (M.A. in history, with honors, 2001) and Warsaw University (M.A. in cultural studies, with honors, 2003). In 2005, Portnov defended his PhD (kandydats`ka dysertaciia) at the Ivan Krypiakevych Institute of Ukrainian Studies of the National Academy of Sciences of Ukraine in Lviv (supervisor Prof. Yaroslav Isaievych).

He was a research fellow or had fellowships at the University of Trier (2004–2006), Center for Holocaust and Genocide Studies in Amsterdam (2007), Institute for European Studies of the National Academy of Sciences of Ukraine in Kyiv (2007–2008), National Institute for Strategic Studies of Ukraine in Kyiv (2008–2010), Center for Russian, Caucasian and Central European Studies (CERCEC) in Paris (2010).

He was an editor of the academic journal "Ukraїna Moderna" (2006–2010), in 2012 he co-founded and co-edited (until 2017) the intellectual web portal Historians.in.ua.

In 2012–2014 he was a Fellow at the Berlin Institute for Advanced Study (Wissenschaftskolleg zu Berlin), in 2012–2016 – Alexander-von-Humboldt Fellow at the Institute for Slavic Studies of the Humboldt University in Berlin and Centre for Contemporary History (ZZF) in Potsdam (from 2015). In 2016–2017 he was a research fellow at the University of Geneva. In 2017 and 2019 he was a short-term Fellow at the Institute for Human Sciences (IWM) in Vienna.

During 2012–2020 Portnov taught courses on Ukrainian and East European history and cultures at the Humboldt University in Berlin, Free University Berlin, Vrije Universiteit Brussel, University of Basel, the Institut d'Etudes Politiques de Lyon, etc.

In 2015 Portnov initiated and became a director of the Berlin-Brandenburg Ukrainian Research Initiative, which transformed itself in 2017 into PRISMA UKRAЇNA Research Network Eastern Europe in Berlin.

In May 2018 Portnov was appointed a professor of entangled history of Ukraine at the European University Viadrina (Frankfurt/Oder). and worked there until 2025.

In 2019 he was also invited as a guest professor to the University of Potsdam.

Prof. Portnov holds membership in PEN Ukraine and the German Association for East European Studies (DGO).

== Awards ==
- 2008 Jerzy Giedroyc Prize.
- 2013 Yuri Shevelov Prize.

== Scholar publications ==
Andrii Portnov has published six books, over 200 articles, book chapters, and reviews. Their thematic scope includes the Polish-Russian-Ukrainian triangle of history and memory, genocide and memory studies, Ukrainian and Soviet historiography, Ukrainian emigration in inter-war Europe, the Partitions of Poland and the Ukrainian politics of the Russian Empire, the history of Dnipro (former Dnipropetrovsk), the personalities of such intellectuals as Volodymyr Parkhomenko, Viacheslav Zaiikyn, Viktor Petrov, Mykola Kovalsky, Omeljan Pritsak, and others.

His scholar texts were published in Ukrainian, Russian, Polish, English, German, French, Japanese, Czech, Bulgarian, Hungarian, and Belarusian.

=== Books ===
- Dnipro. An Entangled History of a European City.
- Stories for Home Use. Essays About the Polish-Ukrainian-Russian Triangle of Memory.
- Histories of Historians. Faces and Images of Ukrainian Historiography of the 20th Century.
- Ukraine`s Exercises with History.
- Between "Central Europe" and "the Russian world": Modern Ukraine in the Space of International Intellectual Discussions.
- Science in Exile: Scientific and Educational Activities of Ukrainian Emigration in Interwar Poland.
- Volodymyr Parkhomenko: a Researcher of the Early History of Rus`.

=== Selected English-language publications ===
- Poland and Ukraine. Entangled Histories, Asymmetric Memories [Essays of the Forum Transregionale Studien 7/2020]. Berlin: Forum Transregionale Studien, 2020. 83 pp
- Mark von Hagen and Ukrainian Studies, Ab Imperio, 2019, № 3, pp. 243–250.
- The Holocaust in the Public Discourse of post-Soviet Ukraine, in: War and Memory in Russia, Ukraine, and Belarus, ed. by Julie Fedor, Markku Kangaspuro, Jussi Lassila, Tatiana Zhurzhenko. Basingstoke: Palgrave Macmillan Memory Studies, 2017, 347–370
- Soviet Ukrainian Historiography in Brezhnev`s Closed City: Mykola/Nikolai Kovalsky and His “School” at the Dnipropetrovsk University, Ab Imperio, 2017, no. 4, 265–291 (with Tetiana Portnova).
- The ‘Great Patriotic War’ in the Politics of Memory in Belarus, Moldova and Ukraine, in: Civic Education and Democratisation in the Eastern Partnership Countries, ed. by Dieter Segert. Bonn: Bundeszentrale für politische Bildung, 2016, 179–197.
- Post-Maidan Europe and the New Ukrainian Studies, Slavic Review, vol. 74, no. 4 (Winter 2015), 723–731.
- The “Imperial” and the “Cossack” in the Semiotics of Ekaterinoslav-Dnipropetrovsk: The Controversies of the Foundation Myth, in Urban Semiotics: The City as a Cultural-Historical Phenomenon, Ed. by Igor Pilshchikov. Tallinn: TLU Press, 2015, 223–250 (with Tetiana Portnova).
- “The Heart of Ukraine?” Dnipropetrovsk and the Ukrainian Revolution, in: What Does Ukraine Think?, ed. by Andrew Wilson, European Council of Foreign Relations, 2015, 62–70.
- The Ukrainian ‘Eurorevolution’. Dynamics and Meaning, in: Ukraine after Euromaidan: Challenges and Hopes, ed. by Viktor Stepanenko, Yaroslav Bylynskyi. Bern: Peter Lang, 2014, 59–72 (with Tetiana Portnova).
- Memory Wars in Post-Soviet Ukraine (1991–2010), in: Memory and Theory in Eastern Europe, ed. by Uilleam Blacker, Alexandr Etkind, Julie Fedor. Basingstoke: Palgrave Macmillian, 2013, 233–254.
- Two Historians in One Lviv, New Eastern Europe, 2011, no. 1, 147–151.

=== Selected essays online ===
- Lost in Transition? Ukraine and Europe since 1989 (2018)
- The arithmetic of otherness. 'Donbas' in Ukrainian intellectual discourse (2017)
- Clash of Victimhoods: The Volhynian Massacre in Polish and Ukrainian Memory (2016)
- Bandera Mythologies and Their Traps for Ukraine (2016)
- How “Eastern Ukraine” was Lost (2016)
- How to bid goodbye to Lenin in Ukraine (2015)

== Videoblogs ==
In the years of 2011–2016 Portnov produced 99 videoblogs on different issues of international humanities (including interviews with Annie Appelboin, Volodymyr Kulyk, Yuri Slezkine, Maria Lewicka, Alvydas Nikzentaitis, Gerhard Simon, and others) for the web portal net.abimperio.net (does not exist anymore). The majority of them could be seen on Portnov`s personal You-Tube Channel. In 2018–2019 Portnov produced 15 video book reviews for his channel, transmitted also by the Espresso TV Channel. In 2018 the You-Tube Channel of the Chair of Entangled History of Ukraine was created, it contains both videos from various Chair`s conferences, summer schools and colloquiums, as well as Prof. Portnov`s new videoblogs.
