= Sergei Androsov =

Russian footballer

Personal information
- Full name: Sergei Vyacheslavovich Androsov
- Date of birth: 18 February 1986 (age 40)
- Height: 1.86 m (6 ft 1 in)
- Position: Defender

Youth career
- CSKA Moscow

Senior career*
Years	Team	Apps	(Gls)
2004–2005	Salyut-Energiya Belgorod	9	(0)
2005–2006	Presnya Moscow	17	(1)
2006–2007	Vitebsk	6	(0)
2007	Sodovik Sterlitamak	11	(0)
2008–2010	Istra	88	(6)
- * Club domestic league appearances and goals

Sergei Vyacheslavovich Androsov (Russian: Сергей Вячеславович Андросов; born 18 February 1986) is a Russian former professional footballer.
