= Andruszkiewicz =

Andruszkiewicz is a Polish surname. Notable people with the surname include:

- Adam Andruszkiewicz (born 1990), Polish politician
- Magdalena Andruszkiewicz (born 1989), Polish para-athlete
- Zbigniew Andruszkiewicz (born 1959), Polish rower
