= Ondřej Vošta =

Czech ice hockey player (born 1968)

- Born: 4 June 1968 (age 57) Tábor, Czechoslovakia
- Height: 5 ft 11 in (180 cm)
- Weight: 183 lb (83 kg; 13 st 1 lb)
- Position: Forward
- Shot: Right
- Played for: Motor České Budějovice; Sangliers Arvernes de Clermont
- Playing career: 1986–2004

Ondřej Vošta (born 4 June 1968) is a Czech former professional ice hockey forward.

Vošta played 292 games for Motor České Budějovice in the Czechoslovak First Ice Hockey League and Czech Extraliga. He also played in France's Super 16 for Sangliers Arvernes de Clermont during the 2002–03 season.

Vošta played in the 1988 World Junior Ice Hockey Championships for Czechoslovakia.
