= Andreu Jacob =

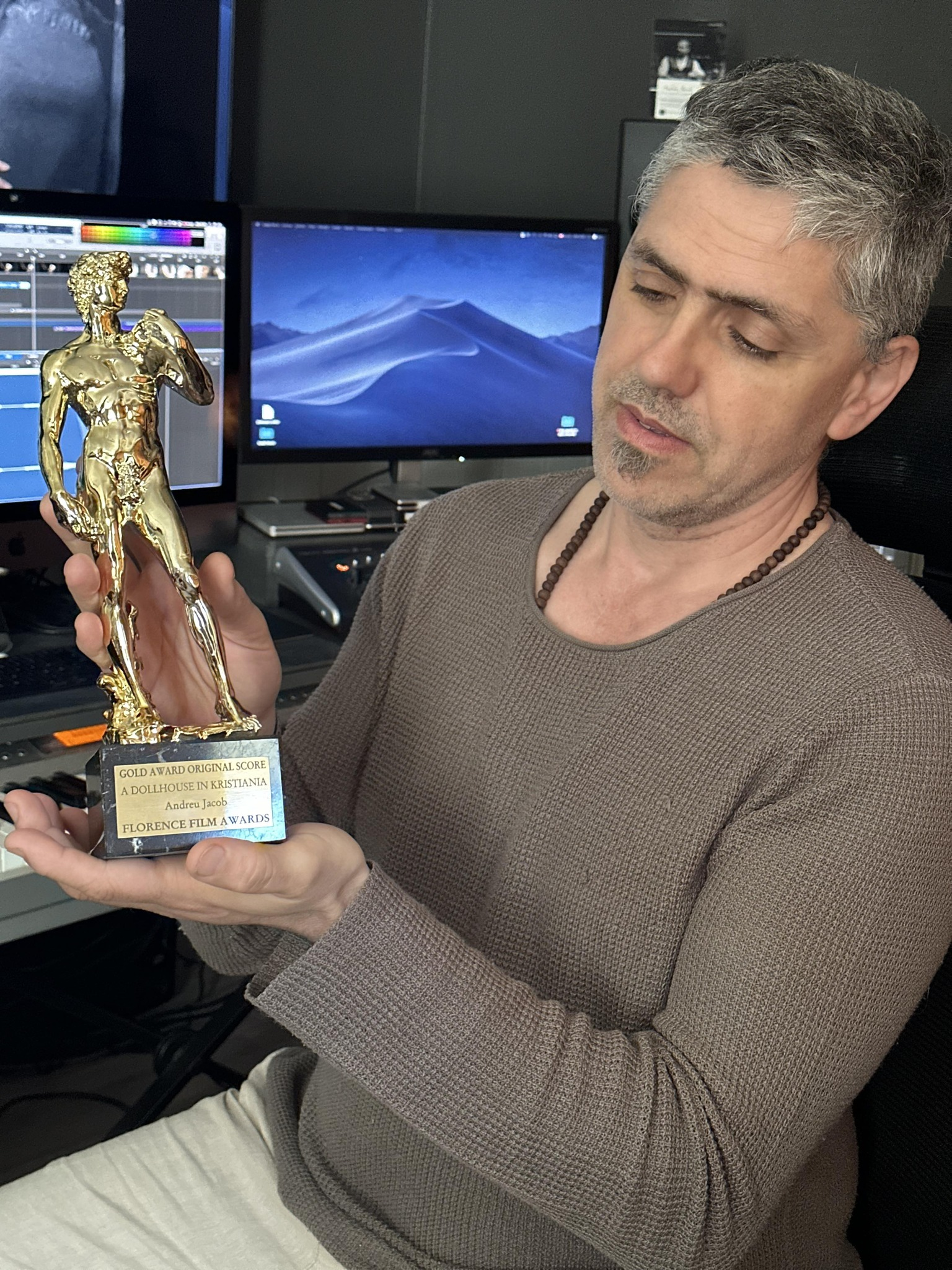
- Andreu Jacob receiving the Gold Award for Best Original Score at the Florence Film Awards (Italy), 2023

Background information
- Born: Andreu Jacob Martínez Foglietti; 18 September 1971; Barcelona, Spain
- Genres: Film music, contemporary classical music, orchestral music
- Occupations: Film composer, orchestrator, sound designer
- Years active: 1990–present
- Website: Official website

Andreu Jacob Martínez Foglietti (born 18 September 1971) is an international film composer, orchestrator and sound designer based in Norway. He is known for composing original scores for feature films, documentaries and short films, as well as for interdisciplinary art projects.

Jacob's work has been presented at major international film festivals, including the Cannes Film Festival (70th and 71st editions). His music combines contemporary orchestral writing, acoustic instrumentation, electronic sound design and field recordings. He has collaborated internationally with filmmakers, production companies and cultural institutions.

== Early life and education ==
Jacob was born in Barcelona, Spain, and grew up in the El Raval neighborhood. He began his musical studies at the age of nine at the Conservatori Superior de Música del Liceu in Barcelona.

In 1995, Jacob participated in his first international jazz festivals in Poland, performing at the 13th edition of Jazz na Kresach in Zamość and at the 10th International Jazz Festival “Solo–Duo–Trio” in Kraków.

In 2000, Jacob won a composition competition held in connection with the 75th anniversary of the Círculo de Bellas Artes in Madrid.

== Career ==
Jacob began his professional career in the early 1990s, initially working as a performer and composer within contemporary music and jazz contexts. Over time, his focus shifted toward composition for visual media, particularly film.

Since the 2010s, Jacob has worked extensively as a film composer and sound designer, contributing original scores to international film productions. His projects include feature films, documentaries and short films produced in Norway, Sweden, Spain, Canada and the United States. Several of his works have been supported by national and international cultural institutions, including the Norwegian Film Institute.

== Festival participation and jury work ==
Jacob's film music has been screened at numerous international film festivals. In addition to festival screenings, he has served as a jury member at several international film festivals, including the Peterhof Film Festival (Saint Petersburg), TNISSFF – The Norwegian International Seagull Film Festival, and the Curta Neblina Latin American Film Festival in São Paulo.

Jacob has led seminars and masterclasses on film music and sound design at international film festivals, including the West Nordic International Film Festival (WENIFF) in Ålesund, Norway, in 2025.

Since 2026, Jacob has served as Director of Scoring at the Luna Lumen Film Festival (United States).

== Awards and recognition ==
Jacob has received international recognition for his work as a film composer and sound designer. His film scores have been awarded at multiple international film festivals, particularly between 2021 and 2025.

Notable awards include:

- Gold Award for Best Original Score – Florence Film Awards (2023), for A Dollhouse in Kristiania.
- Best Original Score – New York Movie Awards (2023), for A Dollhouse in Kristiania.
- Best Original Score – London Movie Awards (2023).
- Best Original Score – 8 & HalFilm Awards (Rome, 2022), for Heart Cycles.
- Best Film Score – Venice Shorts (2021), for Andetaget.

== Selected filmography ==
=== Composer ===
- More Than a Museum (2025).
- Gold Dust (2024).
- The Castle of Baron Finch (2024).
- A Dollhouse in Kristiania (2023).
- Heart Cycles (2023).
- Hunting the Spirit of Time (2023).
- Andetaget (The Breath) (2021).
- Antikk (2020).
- Exuvia (2020).

=== Sound designer ===
- Kunsten å plystre (2021).
- Seyran Ates – Sex, Revolution and Islam (2017) – sound designer; the film was long-listed for the Academy Award for Best Documentary Feature at the 94th Academy Awards.

=== Music performer ===
- Beforeigners (HBO, 2019–2021) – music performer, appearing in six episodes under the musical direction of Ginge Anvik.

== Selected discography ==
Jacob's discography comprises over 100 releases, with more than 1,500 works available on digital platforms.

Selected releases include:

- Green Embrace (2025).
- Gullstøv (Original Motion Picture Soundtrack) (2024).
- The Karate Weirdo (Original Soundtrack) (2024).
- Era apenas uma cidade (2022).
- Sand (Original Soundtrack) (2021).
- Outside (2008).
