= Andrijana =

Andrijana is a feminine given name and may refer to:

- Andrijana Avramov (born 1979), Serbian politician
- Andrijana Janevska (born 1981), Macedonian singer and musician
- Andrijana Stipaničić (born 1981), Croatian biathlete
- Andrijana Videnović (born 1964), Serbian actress
