= Ivan Andreychin =

Bulgarian poet and translator

Ivan Stoyanov Andreychin
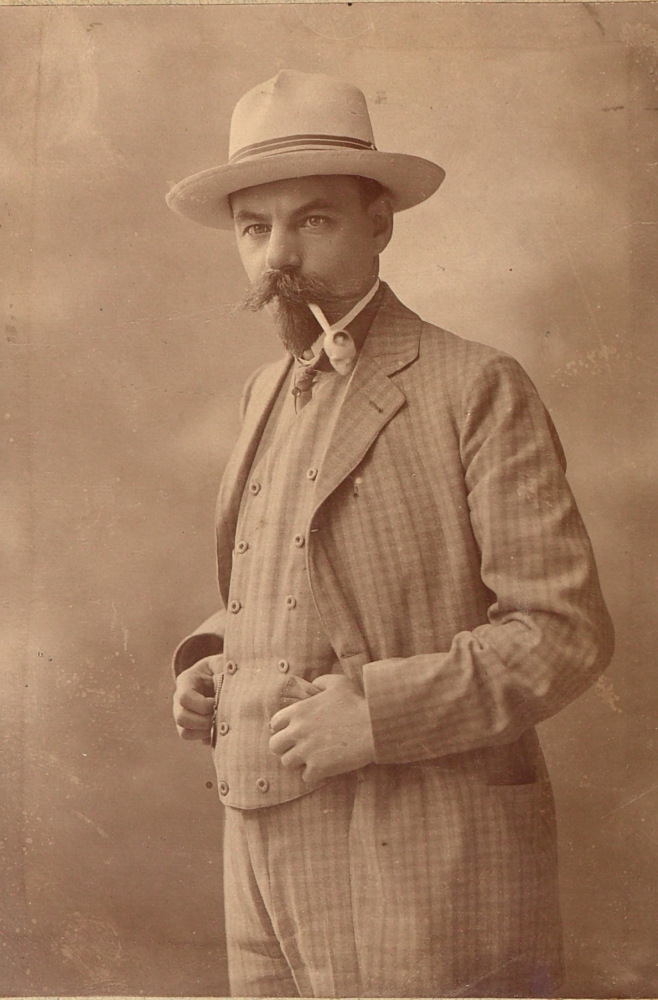
- Born: 1 May 1872; Gabrovo, Ottoman Empire
- Died: 15 February 1934 (aged 61); Sofia, Bulgaria
- Occupations: Teacher, Translator, Editor.

Ivan Stoyanov Andreychin (1872–1934, Bulgarian: Иван Стоянов Андрейчин) was a Bulgarian literary and theater critic, poet, fiction writer, playwright and translator.

== Biography ==
He was born in Gabrovo on May 1, 1872. He received his high school education in Gabrovo, after which he taught in Vratsa. He studied literature in France. He worked as a junior high school and high school teacher of French language and Bulgarian literature in Sofia from 1898 to 1927. Until 1912 he visited France every year, where he lectured on literature. In 1913 he became the chairman of the newly established Union of Bulgarian Writers. From 1915 to 1919 he lived in Switzerland. He participated in the First International Association of Progressive Writers "Clarte", founded by Henri Barbusse in 1919. After his return to Bulgaria he became a teacher, and stayed teaching until 1927.

As a student in 1888 he published his translations of several Russian poems in the magazines "Library" "St. Kliment" and "Iskra”. He regularly collaborated with Thought magazine and frequently edited it. He published in the symbolist magazines "From a New Way" between 1907 and 1910, and "Pearls" from 1911 to 1914. He was editor-in-chief of the first anniversary edition of the magazine "Drum", and he edited the newspaper "Free Thought for Literature, Theater, Art and Criticism" in 1921. He also published in the magazines "Day", "Illustration Light", "Case", "Bulgarian Collection", "New Time", "Artist", "New Society", "Contemporary", "Contemporary Thought", "Beginning", "Art Culture", "Literary Conversation", "New Life" and "Free Speech", among others.

He began his literary career with realistic, socially engaged poems and stories. Around the end of the 19th century and the beginning of the 20th century he evolved more towards symbolism. "From a New Way" was the first typical symbolist Bulgarian magazine. In it Andreychin placed some of the first manifestos of Bulgarian symbolism: "From a new path. Literary Manifesto", "Decadence and Symbolism" and "Anecdote and Symbol".

He compiled collections and anthologies that have since gained wide popularity in Bulgaria, specifically the works "From foreign literature. Literary Collection of Translated Stories, Dramas, Poems, Poems and Sentences” and "Parties and Mornings" (vols. 1-4, 1903–11; vols. 1-2, 1930–31).

He translated "Captain's Daughter" by AS Pushkin, "Taras Bulba" by NV Gogol, "Peleas and Melisanda" and "Princess Malena" by M. Maeterlinck, "The Merry Man" by O. Marden, "The Wanderer Under the Stars" by J. London, "Tales" by H. Kr. Andersen, "David Copperfield" by Charles Dickens and multiple novels by [M. Reed.

He died on February 15, 1934, in Sofia, Bulgaria.

== Selected works ==
- Mom, why are people fighting, 1895.
- Inspired thoughts: Poetic motives. Written in 1895, published in 1896.
- The first step. Written in 1896, published in 1898.
- Love and sorrow: Random verses. 1898
- Dramatic sketches. 1902
- Songs: New verses. 1902
- The book and life: Lit.-obsht. notes. 1903
- In the silence of the night: Mosaics. 1905
- Hristo Botyov: Literary mosaic. 1906 (1909).
- A book about love and women. 1910
- Book about the theater: History, Theoret and Crete. notes. 1910
- Favorite book: Poems in prose and verse. Written in 1914, published in 1919.
- A kiss. 1919
- From the best love letters. 1919
- Garden of caresses: Moorish cassids. 1919
- The Blind Man and the Miracle of Blood. stories. 1923
- Songs about her. Presented by Nikolay Likovski. 1996

== Sources ==
- Encyclopedia of the Bulgarian Theater . Sofia, Trud Publishing House, 2008. ISBN 9545287713, pg 22.
- Ivan Andreychin in Literary World
- A brief biographical reference about Ivan Andreychin on the website of the Lyuben Karavelov Regional Library in Ruse.
- Rosen Tahov, "The writer with the pipe Ivan Andreychin commits suicide with a veronal after being accused of fornication with a 4-year-old child" , 168 Chasa newspaper, September 27, 2017.
- Pencho Kovachev, “Ivan St. Andreychin sentenced to 3 years for pedophilia", "24 Chasa" newspaper, August 24, 2011.
- Boris Dankov, "Knight of the Free Spirit", "Duma" newspaper, issue 47, February 25, 2012.
- Magazine "From a New Way" on the site Bulgarian Literary Modernism.
