= Andreína Mujica =

Venezuelan journalist and photographer

- Born: 27 November 1970 (age 55); Caracas, Venezuela
- Education: Universidad Central de Venezuela
- Occupations: Journalist, photographer
- Parent: Héctor Mujica

Andreína Mujica Áñez (born 27 November 1970) is a Venezuelan journalist and photographer. A graduate of the Central University of Venezuela, she was awarded Best Feature of the Year in 2017 by the Foreign Press Agency. As a photographer she has produced series such as "Enmárcate Venezuela" and "El Cine se sienta en la mesa".

== Career ==
When she was fourteen years old, the director of the newspaper El Nacional, Miguel Otero Silva, invited Andreína to publish a poem in the newspaper. Mujica graduated as a journalist from the Central University of Venezuela. She also studied literature, although she did not finish the career. The journalist would later take postgraduate courses and training internships in Venezuelan and European educational institutions. In the late 1990s, Chavista militant Juan Barreto, later a deputy and mayor of Caracas, attacked a friend of Mujica's family in their home. After denouncing what happened, Barreto threatened Andreína and her mother. Later, in 2010, actress Anastasia Mazzone threatened Mujica by e-mail after her relationship with businessman Wilmer Ruperti became public.

During her career as a journalist, in 2017 she received the Best Report of the Year award from the Foreign Press Agency, received in Paris, and was recognized for her coverage of the Biarritz Film Festival. As a photographer, she started a series known as "Enmárcate Venezuela", a project with more than ten years that began in 2007 in Caracas under the name "Caracas enmarcada". She also founded the non-governmental organization Nelson Garrido, together with historian Liliana Martínez and her teacher Nelson Garrido. By 2022, she was developing the personal project "Cinema Sits at the Table", exhibited in 2020 at the Encounters Art Space festival in the United Kingdom, as well as in 2021 and 2022 in two group shows in Madrid, Spain.

In 2019, she called for the release of journalist Luis Carlos Díaz in a Facebook post. In response, Nicolás Maduro's consul in Paris, Glenna Cabello, falsely accused her of threatening to kill her. The complaint was dismissed by the French authorities after it was shown to be groundless.

== Personal life ==
Andreína is the daughter of Venezuelan journalist and writer Héctor Mujica. In 2010 she emigrated to France to settle in Paris.
