= Mariya Androsova-Ionova =

Russian folklorist, author and performer

Maria Nikolaevna Androsova-Ionova (14 October 1864 - 1941, Tashkent) was a Russian folklorist, author and performer of the Yakut epic olonkho.

She was born on October 14, 1864, in the Yakutsk region. She was brought up by her grandfather. In 1893 she married the exiled V. M. Ionov, who introduced her to collecting Yakut folklore. From 1922 to 1930, she worked at the Museum of Anthropology and Ethnography of the Kunstkamera. She lived in Moscow. In the beginning of World War II, she was evacuated and died in 1941 in Tashkent.

== Works ==
- Samples of the Yakut folk literature collected by E.K. Pekarsky. - SPb., 1909.
- Oguruot aһyn үүnneriite. - M., 1925.
- Soviet folklore: Sat. Art. and mater. - M .; L., 1936.
- Dabaan: Almanac of the Association in Moscow. - M .; Yakutsk, 1938.
- Sakha noruotun ayimnyta / Compiled by G.M. Vasiliev and Kh. I. Konstantinov. - Yakutsk, 1942.
