= Andréia de Olicar =

Brazilian pastor, singer, and composer (1976–2020)

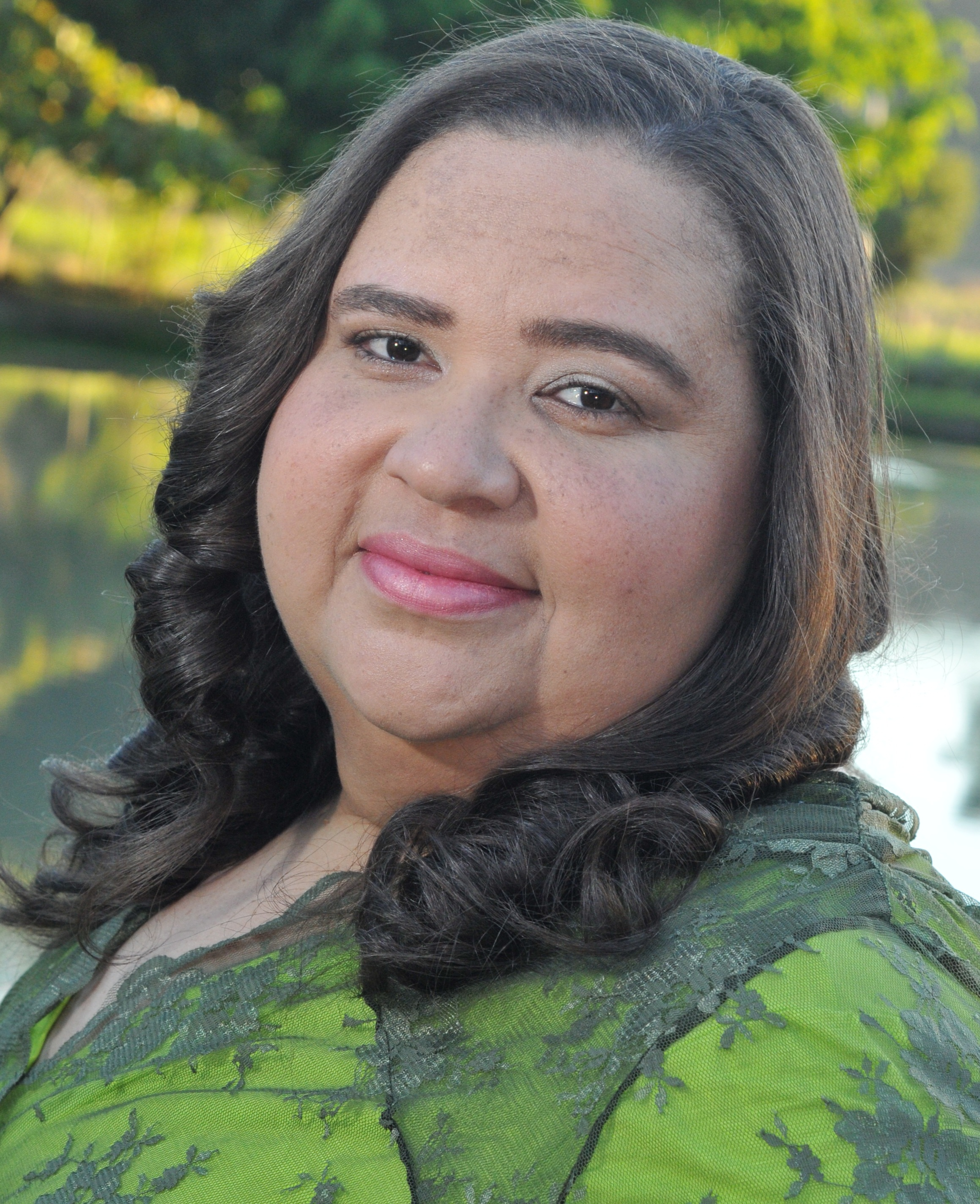
De Olicar in 2014

Andreia de Olicar (Itaocara, 23 March 1976 – 9 August 2020), the stage name of Andréia de Oliveira Carvalho Ribeiro, was a Brazilian pastor, singer and composer of contemporary Christian music.

== Biography ==
The daughter of Dejalma da Rocha Carvalho and Maria Madalena de Oliveira Carvalho, Andreia was a member of the Assemblies of God Church of Itaocara, her hometown. Raised in the Cidade Nova neighborhood, since she was a child she was involved in music, singing in services and other events.

At the age of 4 Andreia became interested in music when she watched her grandfather playing a tambourine. Soon after she learned to play guitar and other instruments, improving her talent. Later she became a music teacher.

In 1998, she recorded her first CD, with the title "Meu Louvor", independently produced. At this time Andreia de Olicar also became better known in evangelical gospel when singers from other regions started recording her compositions. In 2003, she was invited to make another CD that won the title "Manancial".

Residing in the city of Nova Friburgo, in 2014 she recorded her greatest gospel musical success, an extended play with the title "Sou Milagre". In 2016 this became sung in many churches and evangelical events, and was re-recorded by the label Louvor Eterno on the album "A Cruz" by Eliane Fernandes, a Pentecostal singer with a national level career.

She recorded another EP at the end of 2018, her 4th authorial work entitled "Mais que Vencedor". Her songs "Diante do Altar" and "Restituição" were sung by Michelly Silva.

Andreia de Olicar died in her native Itaocara in the night of 9 August 2020, of complications caused by COVID-19 during the pandemic in Brazil. She left her husband and two daughters.
