= Andrei Netto =

Brazilian journalist and writer

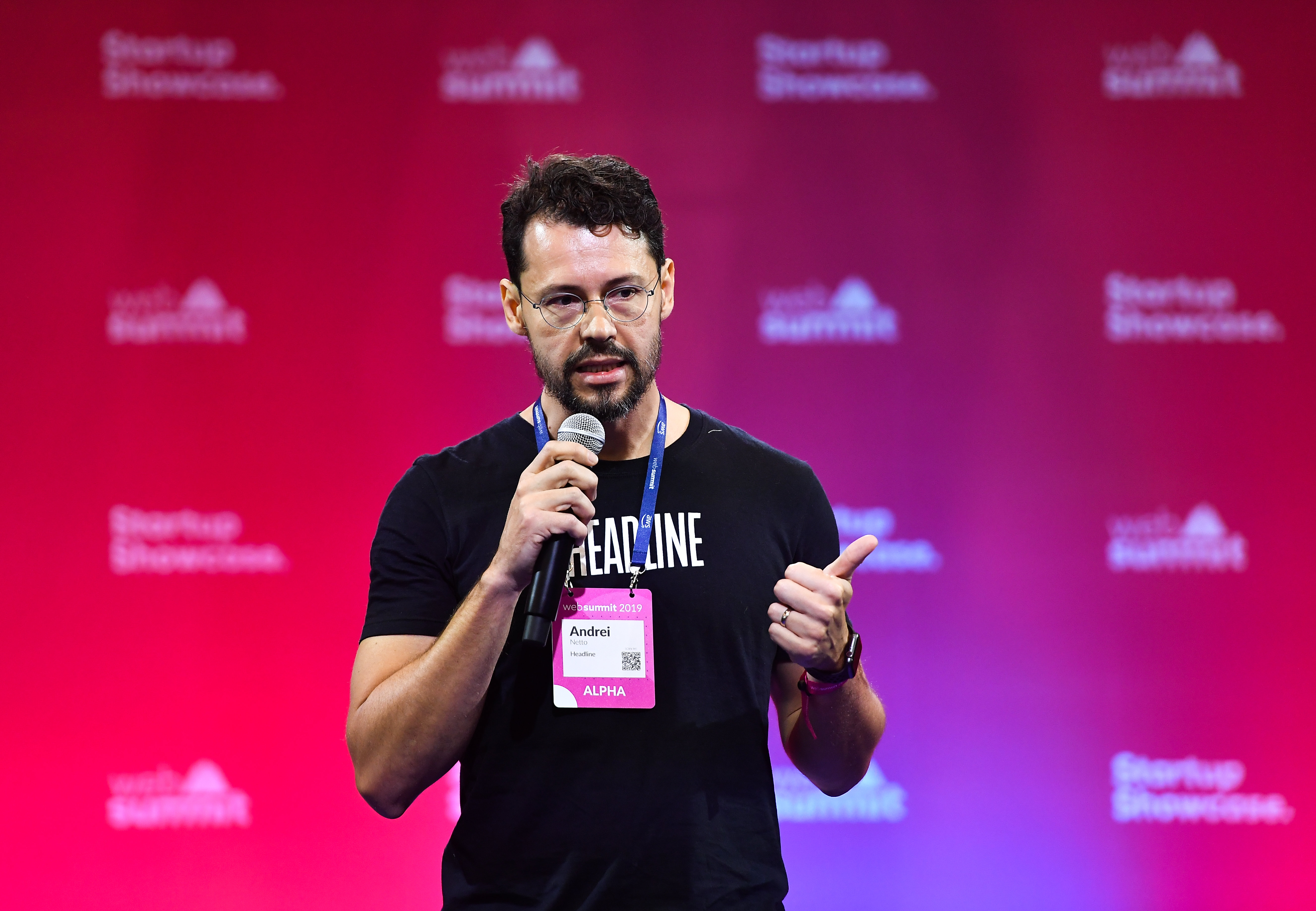
- Andrei Netto at the 2019 Web Summit in Lisbon, Portugal
- Born: 1977 (age 48–49); Ijuí, Rio Grande do Sul
- Occupations: Journalist, author

Andrei Netto (Ijuí, 1977) is a Brazilian journalist and author. He worked at Gazeta Mercantil and Zero Hora. He is currently a correspondent to O Estado de S. Paulo in Paris, France. He graduated in Communication at Pontifícia Universidade Católica do Rio Grande do Sul, where he also got his master's degree, and he obtained his doctorate at Université René Descartes, in Paris.

He covered the 2011 Libyan Civil War and was arrested, gaining national attention due to the episode. He registered his accounts in a book called O silêncio contra Muamar Kadafi - A revolução da Líbia pelo repórter brasileiro que esteve nos calabouços do regime, which was later released in English as Bringing Down Gaddafi: On the Ground with the Libyan Rebels.

== Bibliography ==
- Netto, Andrei (2014). Bringing Down Gaddafi: On the Ground with the Libyan Rebels. Companhia das Letras. pp. 320. ISBN 1137279125.
