= Andrejs Elksniņš =

Latvian politician (born 1982)

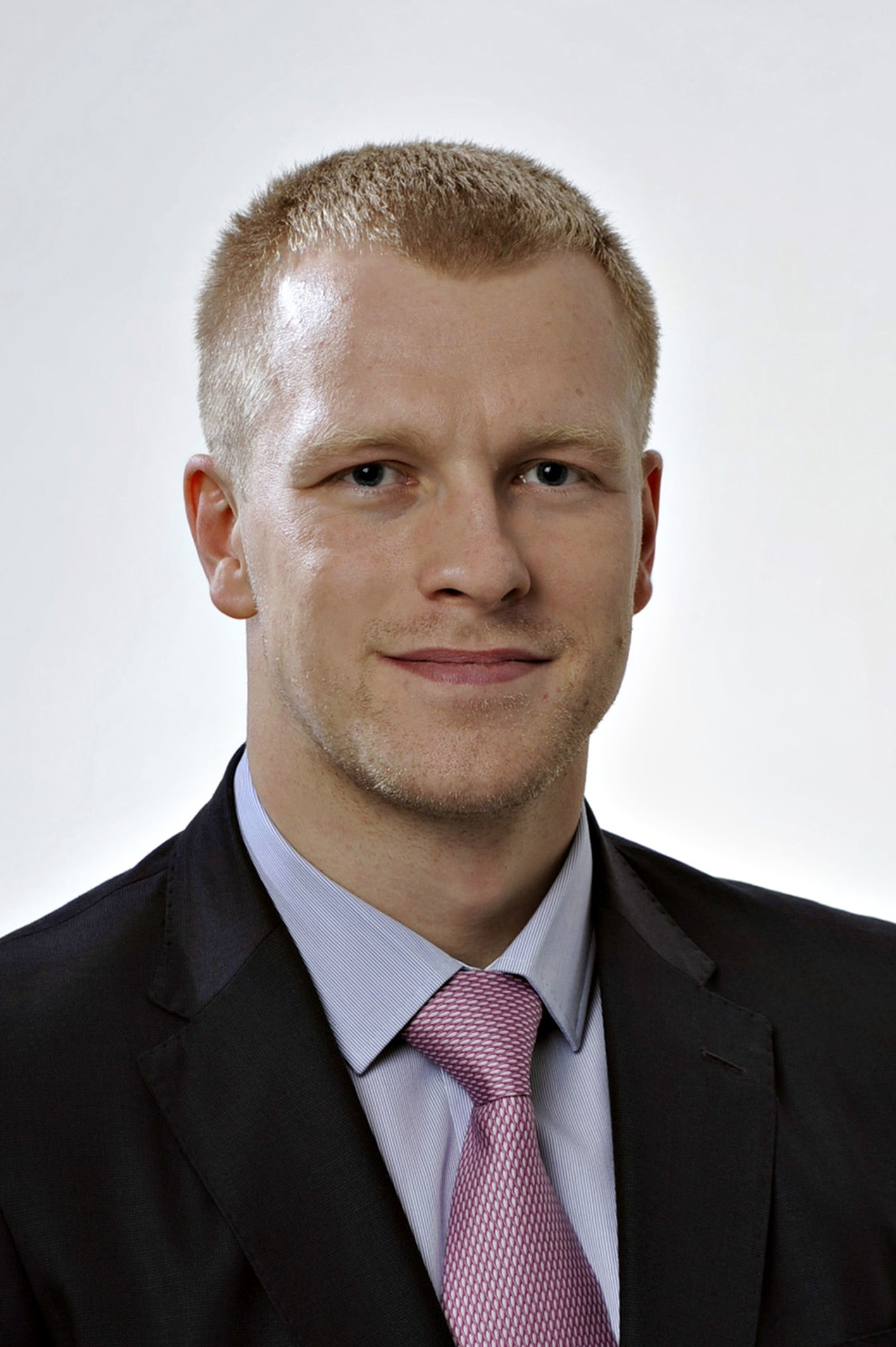

Mayor of Daugavpils
- Incumbent
- Assumed office 1 July 2021
- Preceded by: Igors Prelatovs
- In office 17 January 2019 – 11 June 2020
- Preceded by: Rihards Eigims
- Succeeded by: Igors Prelatovs
- In office 26 June 2017 – 2 September 2017
- Preceded by: Jānis Lāčplēsis
- Succeeded by: Rihards Eigims

Personal details
- Born: 13 December 1982 (age 43) Rīga, Latvian SSR, USSR
- Party: Go, Latgale!
- Other political affiliations: Harmony (2011–2023)
- Education: Latvian Police Academy
- Profession: Lawyer, investigator

Andrejs Elksniņš (born 1982) is a Latvian politician and the current Mayor of Daugavpils. He was a deputy of the 12th Saeima and a long-standing member of the Social Democratic Party "Harmony" until 2023. He is of Latvian and Russian descent.

== Biography ==
Elksniņš started his career as a lawyer, before entering national politics in time for the 2011 Latvian parliamentary election. Elksniņš took office as Mayor of Daugavpils, the second largest city in the country, on 26 June 2017 but was replaced by Rihards Eigims after just two months in office on September 2. After the coalition led by Eigims collapsed on 22 November 2018, Elksniņš was re-elected as mayor on 17 January 2019, but again removed from office on June 11, 2020. The city was then led by Igors Prelatovs, until Elksniņš was reelected for a third time and approved as mayor after the 2021 Latvian municipal elections on July 1.

Following Russia's invasion of Ukraine in 2022, A. Elksniņš gave evasive answers to a journalist's questions about his position on the Russo-Ukrainian War. Supporters of both sides interpreted his statements as expressing support for Russia.

In January 2023, A. Elksniņš announced that he was leaving the Harmony party.

In January 2023, Elksniņš left the Harmony party. In 2024, he established and became the leader of the Daugavpils-based localist political party Go, Latgale!. In the 2025 municipal elections, Elksniņš's list won a decisive victory in Daugavpils, and he was the party's candidate for chair of the city council. At the first meeting of the newly elected council, Elksniņš was re-elected as chair of the council.
