= Mykhailo Andriienko-Nechytailo =

Painter from Ukraine

Mykhailo Andriienko-Nechytailo (French Michel Andreenko, also known as Mikhail Andriyenko-Nechitailo "Mykhaylo Andreenko", among other variations) (1894–1982) was a renowned Ukrainian, French, and Russian Modernist painter and stage designer.

Mykhailo Andriienko-Nechytailo was born in 1894 in Odesa Ukraine. In 1912–1917, he studied under Roerikh, Rylov, and Bilibin at the art school of the Imperial Society for the Encouragement of the Arts in Saint Petersburg. In 1914–1916, he exhibited the composition Black Dome and his first cubist works in Saint Petersburg. In 1914, he participated in an international graphics exhibition in Leipzig. In 1917–1924, he devoted most of his time to designing stage sets for various theaters—in Saint Petersburg, Odesa, Prague, Paris, and for the Royal Opera in Bucharest. In Paris, where he lived from 1923, he also worked on sets for the films Casanova and Sheherazade. He continued to paint in the cubist-constructivist style (e.g., Composition (1924), Construction 1924, or A Person 1926). In the 1930s, Andriienko-Nechytailo produced a series of surrealist paintings (e.g., A Fair Stall 1933). He switched to neorealism in the 1940s and painted a number of portraits as well as a series, the Cityscapes Disappearing Paris (such as Rue Carpeaux 1946, Rue Paul Barruel 1954, Rue Cambronne 1954, and Paysage du Cycle 1956). From 1958, he returned to constructivism and abstraction. Andriienko-Nechytailo's work is characterized by a precision of composition that harmonizes subtly with color. His stage sets are remarkable for their laconic quality and architectural schematism, and his costume designs for their richness. His paintings can be found in the City Museum of Modern Art and the Arsenal Library in Paris, the National Library in Vienna, the Victoria and Albert Museum in London, the Metropolitan Museum in New York, the National Museum in Lviv, and Ukrainian émigré museums and private art collections.
