= Ondřej Zetek =

Czech ice hockey defenceman

- Born: October 2, 1971 (age 53)
- Height: 5 ft 9 in (175 cm)
- Weight: 163 lb (74 kg; 11 st 9 lb)
- Position: Defence
- Shot: Left
- Played for: HC Litvínov; HC Železárny Třinec; HC Plzeň; HC SKP Poprad; HC Vítkovice
- National team: Czech Republic
- Playing career: 1989–2007

Ondřej Zetek (born October 2, 1971) is a Czech former professional ice hockey defenceman.

Zetek played in the Czechoslovak First Ice Hockey League and the Czech Extraliga for HC Litvínov, HC Železárny Třinec, HC Plzeň and HC Vítkovice. He also played one season in the Tipsport Liga for HC SKP Poprad during the 1998–99 season.
