= Andrez =

Andrez is a given name and surname. Notable people with the name include:

- Andrez Bergen (fl. 1996), Australian musician and author
- Andrez Harriott (fl. 1995), member of the British band Damage
