= List of storms named Andrew =

The name Andrew was used for two tropical cyclones in the Atlantic Ocean.

- Tropical Storm Andrew (1986) – which paralleled the southeastern United States.
- Hurricane Andrew (1992) – storm that hit Florida coast at Category 5 intensity resulting in $27.3 billion in damage.

The name was retired after the 1992 hurricane season and was replaced with Alex.
