= Andrzej Sarwa =

Polish writer and journalist

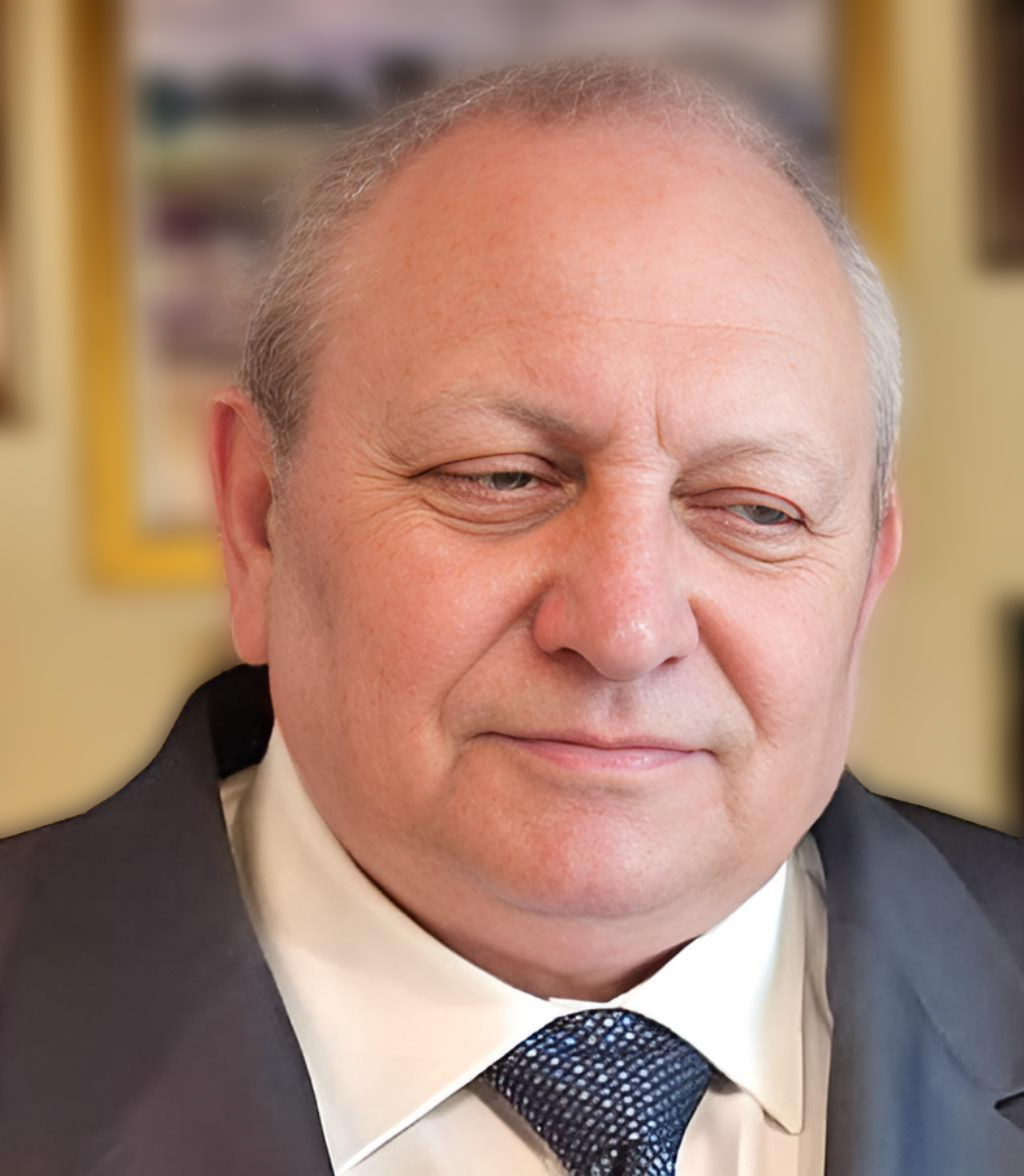
- Born: 12 April 1953; Sandomierz, Poland
- Citizenship: Polish
- Occupations: Prose writer, poet, essayist

Andrzej Juliusz Sarwa ([Pl-Andrzej_Juliusz_Sarwa.oggˈandʐɛj ˈjuliuʂ ˈsarva]; born 12 April 1953 in Sandomierz) a Polish prose writer, poet, journalist. A member of the Polish Writers' Union and the Polish Journalists Association, he has received the Order of Merit of the Republic of Poland. He is an author and co-author of over 200 books and a few hundred articles from different fields, including theological works on eschatology and demonology. Some of them are on the required reading list for theology and religious studies students at Polish universities, including the Jagiellonian University in Kraków, The University of Łódź, Catholic University of Lublin, and Cardinal Stefan Wyszyński University in Warsaw.

== Selected list of works ==
=== Prose ===
- 2013: Uwikłany (Entangled); Sandomierz: Wydawnictwo Diecezjalne
- 2013: Szepty i cienie (Whispers and Shadows); Sandomierz: Wydawnictwo Diecezjalne
- 2013: Ziarna ocalenia (Grains of Salvation); Sandomierz: Wydawnictwo Diecezjalne

=== Poetry ===
- 1992: Tarnina (The Blackthorn); Sandomierz: Wydawnictwo Mandragora
- 2000: Pochody (The Marchers); Sandomierz: ELSA Publishing House
- 2015: Poezje (Poems); Sandomierz: Wydawnictwo Armoryka

=== Theological books ===
- 2002: Eschatologia Kościoła Wschodniego (Eschatology of Eastern Orthodox Church), Łodź: Wydawnictwo Ravi
- 2002: Eschatologia Islamu (Eschatology of Islam), Łodź: Wydawnictwo Ravi
- 2005: Eschatologia Zaratusztrianizmu (Eschatology of Zoroastrianism), Sandomierz: Wydawnictwo Mandragora

== Sources ==
- Andrzej Sarwa: Bibliography in Catalog Polish National Library
- Andrzej Sarwa: Presentation of the subject-object in Gość Niedzielny – Uwikłany w Sandomierz
- Andrzej Sarwa: Presentation of the subject-object in Gość Niedzielny – Thriller… teologiczny
- Andrzej Sarwa: Presentation of the subject-object in Gość Niedzielny – Sandomierzanin Roku 2015
- Andrzej Sarwa: Presentation of the subject-object in Andrzej Juliusz Sarwa, Un'anima e tre ali – Il blog di Paolo Statuti
- Andrzej Sarwa: in Catalog Bibliography Komisja ds. Kultu Bożego Episkopatu Polski
- Andrzej Sarwa: in Baza osób polskich - der polnischen Personendatenbank
