= Ondra =

Ondra is a Czech given name and a surname (feminine for the surname: Ondrová). It is a diminutive for the given name Ondřej. The name may refer to:

- Adam Ondra (born 1993), Czech rock climber
- Anny Ondra (1903–1987), Czech film actress
- Irena Ondrová (1949-2021), Czech politician
- Jiří Ondra (born 1957), Czech soccer player
- Viktorie Ondrová (born 2005), Czech pole vaulter
- Óndra Łysohorsky (1905-1989), Czech poet

== See also ==
- Section Andrew § Andrew-surname contains similar Czech surnames
