= Natalia Andrienko =

Russian computer scientist

Natalia V. Andrienko (also published as Nathalia V. Andrienko) is a Ukrainian computer scientist who has worked in Moldova, Russia, Germany, and England; her research involves information visualization and visual analytics for geographic information systems and spatial data. She is a professor at City, University of London in England, a lead scientist for the Fraunhofer Institute for Intelligent Analysis and Information Systems (IAIS) in Sankt Augustin, Germany, and a principal investigator for the Lamarr Institute for Machine Learning and Artificial Intelligence in Sankt Augustin, Germany.

== Education and career ==
Andrienko studied computer science at Kiev State University (now the Taras Shevchenko National University of Kyiv), and earned a master's degree there in 1985. She earned a Candidate of Sciences in 1993 (a type of doctoral degree in formerly Soviet countries) from Moscow State University.

Before moving to the GMD (now the Fraunhofer Institute) in 1997, she was a researcher at the Institute for Mathematics of the Moldovan Academy of Sciences in Chișinău, Moldova, and in the Institute for Mathematical Problems of Biology in the Pushchino Research Center of the Russian Academy of Sciences in Pushchino, near Moscow.

She became a professor at City, University of London in 2013, while maintaining her affiliation with the Fraunhofer Institute. She is also a principal investigator for the Lamarr Institute for Machine Learning and Artificial Intelligence.

== Books ==
Andrienko is a coauthor of books including:

- Exploratory Analysis of Spatial and Temporal Data: A Systematic Approach (with Gennady Andrienko, Springer, 2006)
- Towards a European Forest Information System (with A. Schuck, T. Green, G. Andrienko, A. Fedorec, A. Requardt, T. Richards, R. Mills, E. Mikkola, R. Paivenen, M. Kohl, and J. San-Miguel-Ayanz, Brill, 2007)
- Visual Analytics of Movement (with Gennady Andrienko, Peter Bak, Daniel Keim, and Stefan Wrobel, Springer, 2013)
- Visual Analytics for Data Scientists (with Gennady Andrienko, Georg Fuchs, Aidan Slingsby, Cagatay Turkay, and Stefan Wrobel, Springer, 2020)

== Recognition ==
Andrienko was named to the IEEE Visualization Academy in 2022.
