= Andrzej Tomaszewicz =

Polish politician (1943–2020)

Andrzej Tomaszewicz (1943 – 11 December 2020), was a Polish historian and politician who served as a Senator.
