= Etelvina Andreu =

Spanish researcher and politician

Etelvina Andreu Sánchez

General Director of Consumer and Citizen Services
- Incumbent
- Assumed office 25 April 2008

Personal details
- Born: 6 March 1969 (age 57) Alicante, Spain
- Party: Spanish Socialist Workers' Party (PSOE)
- Education: University of Valencia (BSc in Physics); University of Alicante (PhD in Medicine)
- Occupation: Politician, researcher
- Profession: Physicist, medical researcher, politician

Etelvina Andreu Sánchez (born 1969) is the General Director of Consumer and Citizen Services of the Spanish Ministry of Health and Social Politics. In addition to her political career, she has also specialised in research into the pancreas.

== Background ==
Andreu was born in Alicante on 6 March 1969. She holds a degree in physics from the University of Valencia, and a doctoral degree in medicine from the University of Alicante.

== Career ==
She started her professional career as a researcher at the University of Alicante, and later she worked as a professor at the Miguel Hernández University. She co-authored several well-cited papers on the functioning of the pancreas.

In 2004 she was appointed as the representative of the Spanish government (Subdelegada del Gobierno) in Alicante.

In the municipal elections of 2007, Etelvina Andreu Sánchez was the Spanish Socialist Workers' Party (Partido Socialista) candidate for the mayor post of Alicante. She lost the elections by about 4,000 votes to the People's Party (Partido Popular), however this was the best of performance of the socialists in Alicante since 1983.

On 25 April 2008, Etelvina Andreu was appointed the General Director of Consumer and Citizen Services of the Ministry of Health and Social Politics. She is closely linked with the Minister Bernat Soria, with whom she crossed during her academic career.

== Selected publications ==
- Angel Nadal; Juan M. Rovira; Ouahiba Laribi; Trinidad Leon-quinto; Etelvina Andreua; Cristina Ripoll; Bernat Soria (1998). "Rapid insulinotropic effect of 17ß-estradiol via a plasma membrane receptor". The FASEB Journal. 12 (13): 1341–1348. doi:10.1096/fasebj.12.13.1341. PMID 9761777. S2CID 15914099.
- Anne Charollais; Asllan Gjinovci; Joachim Huarte; Juliette Bauquis; Angel Nadal; Franz Martín; Etelvina Andreu; Juan V. Sánchez-Andrés; Alessandra Calabrese; Domenico Bosco; Bernat Soria; Claes B. Wollheim; Pedro L. Herrera; Paolo Meda (2000). "Junctional communication of pancreatic β cells contributes to the control of insulin secretion and glucose tolerance". The Journal of Clinical Investigation. 106 (2): 235–243. doi:10.1172/JCI9398. PMC 314309. PMID 10903339.
- Etelvina Andreu; Bernat Soria; Juan V. Sanchez-Andres (1997). "Oscillation of gap junction electrical coupling in the mouse pancreatic islets of Langerhans". Journal of Physiology. 498 (3): 753–761. doi:10.1113/jphysiol.1997.sp021899. PMC 1159191. PMID 9051586.
- Ivan Quesada; Esther Fuentes; Etelvina Andreu; Paolo Meda; Angel Nadal; Bernat Soria (2003). "On-line analysis of gap junctions reveals more efficient electrical than dye coupling between islet cells". American Journal of Physiology. Endocrinology and Metabolism. 284 (5): E980–987. doi:10.1152/ajpendo.00473.2002. PMID 12517739.
