= Mirko Androić =

Yugoslav historian and archivist

Mirko Androić (Croatian pronunciation: [mǐːrko ǎndroitɕ]; 8 July 1922, in Varaždin, Yugoslavia – 7 June 1982) was a Yugoslav historian and archivist. He studied philosophy at the University of Zagreb, then worked as historian and chief archivist of his home town Varaždin. His area of historical study was on the history of political movements in northern Croatia during the 18th century.
