= Reinhard Anders =

German politician (1940–2025)

Member of the Volkskammer
- In office 18 March 1990 – 2 October 1990

Personal details
- Born: 10 February 1940; Seifersdorf, Gau Silesia, Germany
- Died: 12 January 2025 (aged 84)
- Political party: CDU
- Education: Karl Marx University, Leipzig
- Occupation: Veterinarian

Reinhard Anders (10 February 1940 – 12 January 2025) was a German politician. A member of the Christian Democratic Union, he served in the Volkskammer from March to October 1990.

Anders died on 12 January 2025, at the age of 84.
