= Anderle =

Anderle is a German-language surname. It originated as a German diminutive of the given name Andreas. Similar surnames with the same origin are Andrle and Andrýsek. Notable people with the surname include:

- David Anderle (1937–2014), American record producer
- Jiří Anderle (born 1936), Czech painter and graphic artist
- Ádám Anderle (1943–2016), Hungarian historian and hispanist
- Mathias Anderle (born 1993), American singer-songwriter
- Natálya Anderle (born 1986), Brazilian model and beauty pageant titleholder
