= Fritz Anders (geneticist) =

German geneticist and molecular biologist

Fritz Anders (22 November 1919 – 21 December 1999) was a German geneticist and molecular biologist. He was a professor at the University of Giessen.

== Research ==
He worked on tumor genetics and was one of its pioneers in Germany. He started by cross-breeding experiments with fish, of which one line passed on skin cancer, which Myron Gordon had already researched. Anders was able to demonstrate the existence of oncogenes and tumor suppressor genes that counteract the oncogenes. In 1977 he suggested that some human tumors are caused by loss or impairment of suppressor genes. In 1989 he presented an evolutionary tree of cancer genes. He characterized various cancer genes and tested various carcinogens. In 1999, he discovered a new type of genetic causes for cancer, which he called paragenetic, as they were not inherited in the classic way.

In 1987 he became a member of the German National Academy of Sciences Leopoldina. The German Cancer Society awarded him and his wife Annerose Anders in 1993 the German Cancer Award. In 1997 he was awarded the Prince Hitachi Prize for Comparative Oncology. The German Genetics Society awards the Fritz Anders Award for students of genetics in his honor.

== Publications ==
- with J. Roushdy, J. Michel, H. Petry, A. Anders: Paragenetic suppressors of suppressor genes – a new class of oncodeterminants, J. Cancer Res. Clin. Oncol., Band 125, 1999, pp. 123–133
- A Biologist's View of Human Cancer, Dr Mildred Scheel Memorial Lecture, in Neth, Gallo u. a. Modern trends in human leukemia VIII, Springer 1989, pp. 23–45
- The Biology of an Oncogene, Based Upon Studies on Neoplasia in Xiphophorus, in Haematology and Blood Transfusion Vol. 28, Modern Trends in Human Leukemia V, edited by Neth, Gallo, Greaves, Moore, Winkler, Springer 1983, pp. 186-206
- with A. Anders: Etiology of cancer as studied in the platyfish-swordtail system, Biochim. Biophys. Acta, Band 516, 1978, pp. 61–95
- Tumor formation in platyfish-swordtail hybrids as a problem of gene regulation, Experientia, 23, 1967, pp. 1–10
