= Andreas (disambiguation) =

Andreas is both a surname and a given name. Notable people with the name include:

- Andreas (comics) (b. 1951), pen name for Andreas Martens, comic artist
- Andreas (parish), a parish in the Sheading of Ayre, Isle of Man
  - Andreas, Isle of Man, the main village of the parish
- Andreas (poem), an Old English poem
- Andreas (typeface), a humanist serif typeface designed by Michael Harvey
