= Andrei (surname) =

Andrei or Andréi is the surname of the following people:

- Alessandro Andrei (born 1959), Italian shot putter
- Cristiano Andrei (born 1982), Italian discus thrower
- Edward Andrei (born 1975), Romanian water polo player
- Frédéric Andréi (born 1959), French actor and director
- Ionuţ Andrei (born 1985), Romanian bobsledder
- Marcello Andrei (born 1922), Italian film director and screenwriter
- Marin Andrei (1940–2026), Romanian footballer
- Michael Andrei (born 1985), German volleyball player
- Petre Andrei (1891–1940), Romanian sociologist, philosopher and politician
- Roxana Oana Andrei (born 1987), Romanian model and beauty pageant titleholder
- Ștefan Andrei (1931–2014), Romanian communist politician
- Vasile Andrei (born 1955), Romanian wrestler
- Violeta Andrei (born 1941), Romanian actress
- Yannick Andréi (1927–1987), the alias of French film director and screenwriter Jean Antione Andréi

== See also ==
- Andrei
- Andrej
- Andriy
- Andrzej
- Ondrej
- Ondřej
