= Ondrej =

Ondrej is a Slovak male given name, equivalent to Andrew. Notable people with the name include:

- Ondrej Duda (born 1994), Slovak football player
- Ondrej Otčenáš (born 1987), Slovak ice hockey player
- Ondrej Nepela (1951–1989), Slovak figure skater
  - Ondrej Nepela Arena
- Ondrej Janík (born 1990), Slovak ice hockey player
- Ondrej Zošiak (born 1990), Slovak ice hockey defenceman

== See also ==
- Ondřej, the Czech version of the same name, but is pronounced with a soft "ř"
- Andrej
- Andrey
- Andrei
- Andrei (surname)
- Andrzej
