= Ander =

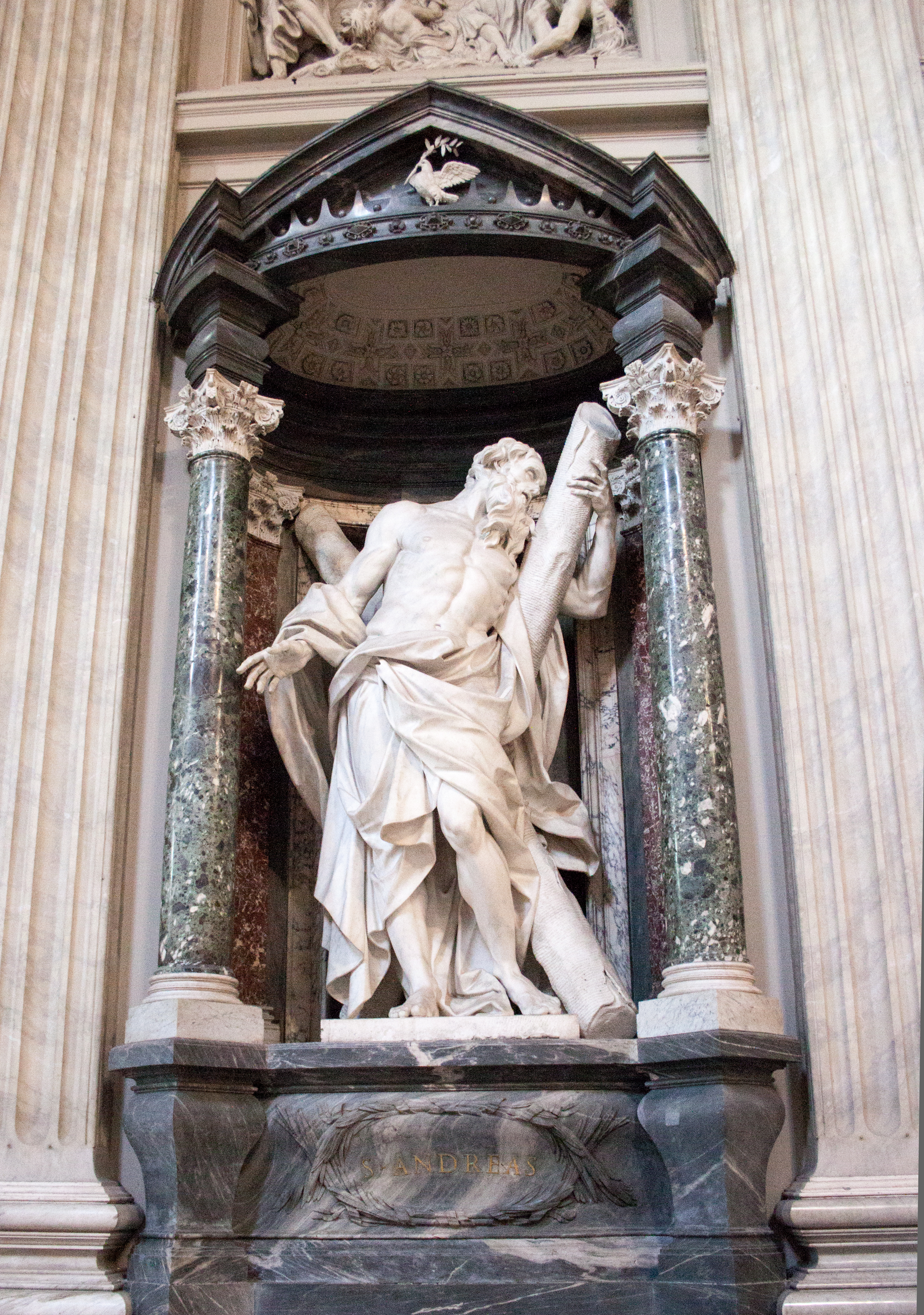
Statue of St. Andreas at the Archbasilica of Saint John Lateran, Rome

The masculine name Ander is a variant of the Greek name "Andreas". Other variants of the Greek name "Andreas" are Andrés and Andrew, as well as Anders.

The masculine name Ander is a variant Basque form of Andrew.

Notable people with the name Ander include:

== Given name ==
- Ander Crenshaw (born 1944), American banker, attorney and politician
- Ander Monson, American novelist, poet, and nonfiction writer
- Ander Monro (born 1981), Canadian rugby player
- Ander Herrera (born 1989), Spanish footballer
- Ander Lafuente Aguado (born 1983), Spanish footballer
- Ander Elosegi (born 1987), Spanish slalom canoeist
- Ander Gago (born 1984), Spanish footballer
- Ander García, Spanish basketball player
- Ander Garitano (born 1969), Spanish football player and coach
- Ander Iturraspe (born 1989), Spanish footballer
- Ander Mirambell (born 1983), Spanish skeleton racer
- Ander Murillo (born 1983), Spanish/Basque footballer
- Ander Olaizola (born 1989), Spanish footballer
- Ander Vilariño (born 1980), Spanish racecar driver
- Ander Barrenetxea (born 2001), Spanish footballer
- Ander Capa (born 1992), Spanish footballer
- Ander Vitoria (born 1990), Spanish footballer
- Walter Ander Williams (born 1970), American basketball player
- Ander Gil (born 1974), Spanish teacher and politician who served the 62nd Senate of Spain from 2021 to 2023

== Characters with the given name ==
- Ander Muñoz, he is one of the protagonists of the Netflix series Elite played by Arón Piper.
- Ander Elessedil, character in Terry Brooks' epic fantasy novel The Elfstones of Shannara

== Surname ==
- Charlotte Ander (1902–1969), daughter of German stage/film couple Rudolf Andersch and Ida Perry
- Johan Alfred Ander (1873–1910), convicted Swedish murderer, the last person to be officially executed in Sweden
