= Andrejs =

Male given name

- Gender: Male
- Name day: 30 November

Origin
- Region of origin: Latvia

Other names
- Related names: Andris

Andrejs is a Latvian masculine given name. It is a cognate of the name Andrew and may refer to:

- Andrejs Apsītis (1888–1945), Latvian cyclist and Olympic competitor
- Andrejs Auzāns (1871–1953), Latvian military general and topographer
- Andrejs Butriks (born 1982), Latvian football forward and sporting director
- Andrejs Dūda (born 1981), Latvian swimmer and Olympic competitor
- Andrejs Elksniņš (born 1982), Latvian politician
- Andrejs Everitt (born 1989), Australian rules footballer
- Andrejs Freimanis (1914–1994), Latvian Obersturmführer in the Waffen SS during World War II
- Andrejs Grants (born 1955), Latvian photographer and teacher
- Andrejs Gražulis (born 1993), Latvian basketball player
- Andrejs Kapmals (1889–1994), Latvian track and field athlete and Olympic competitor
- Andrejs Kiriļins (born 1995), Latvian footballer
- Andrejs Klementjevs (born 1973), Latvian politician
- Andrejs Krūkliņš (1891–2001), Latvian track and field athlete and Olympic competitor
- Andrejs Koroļevs (born 1969), Latvian-born Polish motorcycle speedway rider
- Andrejs Kovaļovs (born 1989), Latvian football midfielder
- Andrejs Mamikins (born 1976), Latvian politician and journalist
- Andrejs Maticins (born 1963), Latvian ice hockey player and coach
- Andrejs Osokins (born 1984), Latvian pianist
- Andrejs Pavlovs (born 1979), Latvian football goalkeeper
- Andrejs Perepļotkins (born 1984), Ukrainian-born Latvian football forward and midfielder
- Andrejs Piedels (born 1970), Latvian football goalkeeper and assistant coach
- Andrejs Pildegovics (born 1971), Latvian diplomat and ambassador
- Andrejs Prohorenkovs (1977–2025), Latvian football striker
- Andrejs Pumpurs (1841–1902), Latvian poet and independence activist
- Andrejs Rastorgujevs (born 1988), Latvian biathlete and Olympic competitor
- Andrejs Rubins (born 1978), Latvian football midfielder
- Andrejs Šeļakovs (born 1988), Latvian basketball centre
- Andrejs Štolcers (born 1974), Latvian football attacking midfielder and coach
- Andrejs Upīts (1877–1970), Latvian teacher, poet, short story writer and Communist polemicist
- Andrejs Vlascenko (born 1974), German-born Russian figure skater who competed for Latvia and Olympic competitor
