= Ondřej =

Ondřej (Czech pronunciation: [ˈondr̝ɛj]) is a Czech masculine given name. it is equivalent to Andrew, Andreas, etc. A commonly used short form (hypocorism) is Ondra. Notable people with the name include:

== Sports ==
- Ondřej Bank (born 1980), Czech alpine skier
- Ondřej Buchtela (1999–2020), Czech ice hockey player
- Ondřej Čelůstka (born 1989), Czech footballer
- Ondřej Cverna (born 1990), Czech footballer
- Ondřej Fiala (born 1987), Czech ice hockey player
- Ondřej Herzán (born 1981), Czech footballer
- Ondřej Hotárek (born 1984), Czech skater
- Ondřej Hutník (born 1983), Czech kick boxer
- Ondřej Hyman (born 1986), Czech luger
- Ondřej Kraják (born 1991), Czech footballer
- Ondřej Kratěna (born 1977), Czech ice hockey player
- Ondřej Kučera (born 1987), Czech footballer
- Ondřej Kúdela (born 1987), Czech footballer
- Ondřej Kušnír (born 1984), Czech footballer
- Ondřej Lingr (born 1998), Czech footballer
- Ondřej Liška (born 1977), Czech politician
- Ondřej Mazuch (born 1989), Czech footballer
- Ondřej Murín (born 1991), Czech footballer
- Ondřej Moravec (born 1984), Czech biathlete
- Ondřej Němec (born 1984), Czech ice hockey player
- Ondřej Palát (born 1991), Czech ice hockey player
- Ondřej Pála (born 1984), Czech boxer
- Ondřej Pavelec (born 1987), Czech ice hockey player
- Ondřej Petrák (born 1992), Czech footballer
- Ondřej Poživil (born 1987), Czech ice hockey player
- Ondřej Pukl (1876–1936), Czech athlete
- Ondřej Raab (born 1973), Czech slalom canoeist
- Ondřej Roman (born 1989), Czech ice hockey player
- Ondřej Sehnal (born 1997), Czech basketball player
- Ondřej Šiml (born 1986), Czech footballer
- Ondřej Smetana (footballer) (born 1982), Czech footballer
- Ondřej Smetana (speedway rider) (born 1995), Czech speedway rider
- Ondřej Sosenka (born 1975), Czech cyclist
- Ondřej Šourek (born 1983), Czech footballer
- Ondřej Starosta (born 1979), Czech basketball player
- Ondřej Štěpánek (born 1979), Czech slalom canoeist
- Ondřej Synek (born 1982), Czech rower
- Ondřej Vaculík (born 1986), Czech ski jumper
- Ondřej Vaněk (born 1990), Czech footballer
- Ondřej Veselý (born 1977), Czech ice hockey player
- Ondřej Vošta (born 1968), Czech ice hockey player
- Ondřej Vrzal (born 1987), Czech footballer
- Ondřej Zahustel (born 1991), Czech footballer
- Ondřej Zetek (born 1971), Czech ice hockey player
- Ondřej Zmrzlý (born 1999), Czech footballer

== Other ==
- Ondřej Havelka (born 1954), Czech singer
- Ondřej Hejma (born 1951), Czech singer
- Ondřej Neff (born 1945), Czech writer
- Ondřej Sekora (1899–1967), Czech painter and writer
- Ondřej Sokol (born 1971), Czech film director
- Ondřej Soukup (born 1951), Czech music composer
- Ondřej Trojan (born 1959), Czech film producer
- Ondřej Vetchý (born 1962), Czech actor

== See also ==
- Andrei (surname), a surname
- Andrei
- Andrej
- Andriy
- Andrzej
- Ondrej
