= Anders =

- Pronunciation: Danish: [ˈɑnɐs] Swedish: [ˈânːdɛʂ] Norwegian: [ˈɑ̂nːəʂ]
- Gender: Male
- Language: Danish, Norwegian, Swedish

Other names
- See also: Andreas, Andrew, Andres

Anders is a male name in Scandinavian languages and Fering North Frisian, an equivalent of the Greek Andreas ("manly") and the English Andrew. It originated from Andres via metathesis.

In Sweden, Anders has been one of the most common names for many centuries, earliest attested in 1378. It was common for priests and farmers during medieval times. According to Statistics Sweden, as of 31 December 2021 it ranks 4th among the male names. The great frequency of this name at the point in time (around 1900) when patronymics were converted into family names is the reason why 1 out of every 30 Swedes today is called Andersson.

The name day of Anders in the Scandinavian calendar is 30 November, and in the old peasant superstition that day was important for determining what the Christmas weather would be. If it was very cold on 30 November there would be much sleet on Christmas (and vice versa).

In Denmark, Donald Duck's name is Anders And.

The Fering name Anders may have been borrowed from the Danish version.

== People ==
=== Given name ===
- Anders Aarum (born 1974), Norwegian jazz pianist
- Anders Aalborg (1914–2000), Canadian teacher and politician
- Anders Ådahl (born 1972), Swedish politician
- Anders Ahlgren (1888–1976), Swedish Greco-Roman wrestler
- Anders Andersen (1912–2006), Danish politician
- Anders Antonsen (born 1997), Danish badminton player
- Anders Anundsen (born 1975), Norwegian politician
- Anders Aplin (born 1991), Singapore football player
- Anders Arborelius (born 1949), Swedish Roman Catholic cardinal
- Anders Askevold (1834–1900), Norwegian painter
- Anders August (born 1978), Danish screenwriter
- Anders Aukland (born 1972), Norwegian cross-country skier
- Anders Bjork, American football player
- Anders Björklund (born 1945), Swedish neuroscientist
- Anders Björler (born 1973), Swedish musician and songwriter
- Anders Blume (born in 1985), Danish CS:GO commentator
- Anders Behring Breivik (born 1979), Norwegian terrorist and right-wing extremist
- Anders Boesen (born 1976), Danish badminton player
- Anders Brännström (born 1957), Swedish Army major general
- Anders Callert (born 1965), Swedish Army major general
- Anders Carlson (American football) (born 1998), American football player
- Anders Carlsson (ice hockey) (born 1960), Swedish ice hockey player
- Anders Celsius (1701–1744), Swedish astronomer
- Anders Danielsen Lie (born 1979), Norwegian actor, musician and doctor
- Anders Daun (born 1963), Swedish ski jumper
- Anders Ekegren (born 1957), Swedish politician
- Anders Eklund (boxer) (1957–2010), Swedish boxer
- Anders Eriksson (born 1975), Swedish ice hockey player
- Anders Fannemel (born 1991), Norwegian ski jumper
- Anders Frandsen (1960-c. 2012), Danish actor and musician
- Anders Fridén (born 1973), Swedish death metal singer for the band In Flames
- Anders Gustafsson (1978–1995), Swedish murder victim
- Anders Gärderud (born 1946), Swedish steeplechase runner
- Anders Abraham Grafström (1790–1870), Swedish poet and historian
- Anders Hedberg (born 1951), Swedish ice hockey player
- Anders Hejlsberg (born 1960), Danish software engineer
- Anders Holm, American writer, Workaholics
- Anders Holmertz (born 1968), Swedish swimmer
- Anders Jacobsen (ski jumper) (born 1985), Norwegian ski jumper
- Anders Järryd (born 1961), Swedish tennis doubles player
- Anders Kaliff (born 1963), Swedish archaeologist
- Anders Kraft (born 1968), Swedish journalist and news anchor
- Anders Lange (1904–1974), Norwegian politician
- Anders Langlands, visual effects supervisor
- Anders Lee (born 1990), American ice hockey player
- Anders Limpar (born 1965), Swedish footballer
- Anders Lind (born 1998), Danish table tennis player
- Anders Lindegaard (born 1984), Danish footballer
- Anders Linderoth (born 1950), Swedish football player and coach
- Anders Lindström (born 1969), Swedish rock guitarist and pianist
- Anders Lindström (born 1955), Swedish Army officer
- Anders Lustgarten, British playwright
- Anders Ly (born 1995), Canadian singer and songwriter
- Anders Olson Lysne (1764–1803), Norwegian rebel leader
- Anders Nilsen (disambiguation), multiple people
- Anders Örne (1881–1956), Swedish politician
- Anders Österberg (born 1981), Swedish politician
- Anders Paulsen (died 1692), North Sami noaidi, last victim of the Vardø witch trials
- Anders Holch Povlsen (born 1972), Danish billionaire, owner of clothing chain Bestseller
- Anders Sandøe Ørsted (1778–1860), Danish politician and jurist, Prime Minister of Denmark
- Anders Sandøe Ørsted (botanist) (1816–1872), Danish botanist, mycologist, zoologist and marine biologist
- Anders Rapp (1927–1998), Swedish geographer
- Anders Fogh Rasmussen (born 1953), Danish politician, Prime Minister of Denmark and Secretary General of NATO
- Anders Skaarseth (born 1995), Norwegian cyclist
- Anders Södergren (born 1977), Swedish cross-country skier
- Anders Svensson (bandy) (born 1975), Swedish bandy player
- Anders Svensson (canoeist) (born 1977), Swedish canoer
- Anders Svensson (footballer, born 1976), Swedish footballer
- Anders Svensson (footballer, born 1939) (1939–2007), Swedish footballer
- Anders Sunesen (c. 1167–1228), Danish archbishop
- Anders Erikson Sparrman (1748–1820), Swedish naturalist and abolitionist
- Anders Szalkai (born 1970), Swedish long-distance runner
- Anders Thunborg (1934–2004), Swedish politician and diplomat
- Anders Wijkman (born 1944), Swedish politician
- Anders Zorn (1860–1920), Swedish painter, sculptor and printmaker

=== Middle name ===
- David Anders Holt (born 1981), American actor
- Paul Anders Ogren (born 1951), American carpenter, farmer, and politician
- Bengt Anders Valter Oldinger (1911–1988), Swedish painter

=== Surname ===
- Allison Anders (born 1954), American film and television director
- Andrea Anders (born 1975), American actress
- Andy Anders (born 1956), Louisiana state representative
- Benny Anders (born 1963), American basketball player
- Christian Anders (born 1945), Austrian singer and composer
- Edward Anders (1926–2025), Latvian-born American geochemist and historian of the Holocaust
- Ernst Anders (1845–1911), German painter
- Eryk Anders (born 1987), American mixed martial artist
- Frank L. Anders (1875–1966), U.S. Army soldier awarded the Medal of Honor
- Fritz Anders (aviator) (1889–1919), German World War I flying ace
- Fritz Anders (geneticist) (1919–1999), German geneticist and molecular biologist
- Günther Anders (1902–1992), German thinker
- Günther Anders (cinematographer) (1908–1977), German cinematographer
- Helga Anders (1948–1986), Austrian actress
- Ira Anders (1942–2025), American politician in Missouri
- Joe Anders (born 2003), American-British actor
- Merry Anders (1932–2012), American actress
- Peter Anders (tenor) (1908–1954), German operatic tenor
- Reinhard Anders (1940–2025), German politician
- Rob Anders (born 1972), Canadian politician
- Ron Anders Jr., American politician
- Thomas Anders (born 1963), stage name of German singer Bernd Weidung
- William Anders (1933–2024), American astronaut, Air Force officer, and businessman
- Władysław Anders (1892–1970), Polish general and politician

== Fictional characters ==
- Anders (Dragon Age), a character in the Dragon Age video game series
- Andurs, a Nord priest of Arkay, and Anders (deceased bandit), characters in The Elder Scrolls V: Skyrim, a game heavily influenced by Scandinavian culture
- Captain Leslie Anders, supporting character in the 1968 movie ”Ice Station Zebra”, played by the actor Jim Brown
- Joseph Anders, a character in the U.S. TV series Dynasty and its reboot
- Kory Anders, civilian name for DC Comics superheroine Starfire
- Anders 'Dup' DuPlessis, a character in the UK ITV Series "Wild at Heart", played by the actor Dion Stewardson
