= André =

- Pronunciation: /ˈɑːndreɪ/, /ˈɒndreɪ/ Portuguese: [ɐ̃ˈdɾɛ] French: [ɑ̃dʁe]
- Gender: Male
- Language: French, Portuguese and others
- Name day: November 30

Origin
- Region of origin: France, Quebec, Portugal, Spain, Brazil, Mexico, Colombia, Canada, United States, Italy and others

Other names
- Alternative spelling: Andre
- Nicknames: Andy, Dre
- Related names: Andrew; Ander; Anderson; Andy; Andrei; Andrejs; Andrzej; Andriy; Andrea; Andreas; Andrée/Andrey; Andrej; Andrés; Drew

André — sometimes transliterated as Andre — is the French and Portuguese form corresponding to the English name Andrew and is now also used in the English-speaking world. It is used in France, Quebec, Canada and other French-speaking countries, as well as in Portugal, Brazil and other Portuguese-speaking countries. It is a variation of the Greek name Andreas, a short form of any of various compound names derived from andr- 'man, warrior'.

The name is popular in Norway and Sweden.

== Cognate names ==
Cognate names are:

- Bulgarian: Andrei, Andrey
- Breton : Andrev
- Catalan: Andreu
- Czech: Andrej, Ondřej
- Dutch: André, Andries
- English: Andrew, André
- Estonian: Andres, André/Andre, Andero
- Finnish: Antero
- French: André
- German: André/Andre, Andreas
- Hungarian: András, Endre
- Icelandic: Andri
- Indonesian: Andri
- Italian: Andrea
- Irish: Aindrias, Aindréas; Aindriú
- Japanese: アンデルー (Anderū), アンドレー (Andorē)
- Lithuanian: Andrius
- Lingala : André
- Latin : André
- Latvian: Andrejs
- Maltese: Indri
- Norwegian: André/Andre, Anders
- Polish: Andrzej, Jędrzej
- Portuguese: André
- Romanian: Andrei
- Russian: Andrei, Andrey
- Scottish Gaelic: Aindrea, Anndra
- Serbo-Croatian: Andrej, Andreja, Andrija
- Slovenian: Andrej
- Spanish: Andrés
- Swedish: André/Andre
- Ukrainian: Andrii, Andriy
- Welsh: Andras

== Notable people with this first name include ==
- André (footballer, born 1972) (André Luíz Alves Santos), Brazilian footballer
- André (footballer, born 2001) (André Trindade da Costa Neto), Brazilian footballer
- Andre Agassi, American tennis player
- André Aleman, Dutch neuroscientist
- Andre Anis, Estonian football player
- Andre Anthony (born 1996), American football player
- André Ascencio (1938–2017), French footballer
- André-Marie Ampère, French physicist
- Arnoldo André Tinoco, Costa Rican politician
- André do Avelar (1546–1???), Portuguese author and professor
- Andre Baccellia (born 1997), American football player
- André Bachand (born 1934), Canadian politician
- André Bachand (born 1961), Canadian politician
- Andre Baker (wrestler) (1964–2010), British professional wrestler
- André Bardet (1909–2006), French painter
- André Baumer (born 1997), Brazilian footballer
- André Bessette (1845–1937), Catholic Saint
- André Béguin (1927–2021), Swiss war criminal and commandant of the World War II Wauwilermoos internment camp
- André Benjamin, also known as André 3000, American musician, record producer and actor
- André Dieudonné Berre (born 1940), Gabonese politician
- André Bona, French footballer
- Andre Braugher (1962–2023), American actor
- André Breton, French writer and theorist
- André Butzer, German painter
- André Burakovsky, Swedish ice hockey player
- Andre Campbell (physician), American
- Andre Carter (born 1979), American football player
- Andre Carter II (born 2000), American football player
- Andre Castro (racing driver), American racing driver
- André Castro (born 1988), Portuguese football player
- André Cayatte, French filmmaker and lawyer
- Andre Chachere (born 1996), American football player
- André Chapelon (1892-1978), French mechanical engineer
- André Chénier, French poet
- Andre Cisco (born 2000), American football player
- André Citroën, French inventor and engineer
- André Cools, Belgian politician
- André Courrèges (1923–2016), French fashion designer
- André Frédéric Cournand, French physician and physiologist
- Andre Dawson, American baseball player
- Andre De Grasse, Canadian sprinter
- André De Ridder, German classical musician
- André Dekeijser (1924–2013), Belgian contemporary sculptor
- André Derain, French painter
- Andre Dillard, American National Football League (NFL) football player
- André van Duin, Dutch comedian
- André van Duren (born 1958), Dutch film director
- Andre Finkelstein (1923–2013), French chemist
- Andre Fuller (born 2002), American football player
- André Gagnon (1936–2020), Canadian composer and pianist
- Andre Geim, Dutch-British physicist
- André Gide, French writer
- André de Gouveia, Portuguese humanist and pedagogue
- André Grétry, French composer
- Andre Gregory, French-born American writer, director and actor
- André Greipel, German cyclist
- André Haefliger (1929–2023), Swiss mathematician
- Andre Harrell (1960–2020), American record producer, songwriter, rapper (Dr. Jeckyll & Mr. Hyde), and founder of Uptown Records
- Andre Hollins, American basketball player
- Andre Iguodala, American basketball player
- Andre James (born 1997), American football player
- Andre Jones (disambiguation), multiple people
- Andre Jordan, British artist, writer and poet
- Andre Kaup, German electrical engineer
- André Richardson King (born 1931), American designer and architect
- André Knevel (born 1950), Canadian concert organist, arranger, accompanist, and organ teacher
- André Krzatala (born 1999), German footballer
- André Kuipers, Dutch astronaut
- André Kuper (born 1960), German politician
- André Lafargue (1917–2017), French journalist and theatre critic
- André Lange, German bobsledder
- André Latarjet (1877–1947), French physician
- André Le Nôtre, French architect
- Andre Lodemann (born 1970), German disk jockey, composer, producer and label-founder
- André-Raphaël Loemba, republic of the Congo politician
- André Lotterer, German-Belgian racing driver
- Andre McCarter (born 1953), American basketball player
- André Michel Lwoff, French biologist
- André Malraux, French writer, art theorist, and Minister of Cultural Affairs
- André Maurois, French writer
- André Maranne, French-born British actor
- André Masséna, French military commander in French Revolutionary and Napoleonic Wars
- André Mendonça, Brazilian attorney, pastor, and politician
- André Furtado de Mendonça, Portuguese governor of India
- André Michelin, French industrialist who founded the Michelin Tyre Company
- Andre Miller, American basketball player
- Andre Mintze (born 1998), American football player
- André Moynet, French wartime fighter pilot and politician
- André Myhrer, Swedish World Cup alpine ski racer and Olympic gold medalist
- André Nascimento (volleyball) (born 1979), Brazilian volleyball player
- André Nascimento (footballer), André Francisco do Nascimento (1982–2010), Brazilian forward
- André Neles (1978–2020), Brazilian footballer
- Andre Norton (1912–2005), American science fiction and fantasy writer
- Andre Novoa (born 1985), Portuguese game designer
- André Onana (born 1996), Cameroonian footballer
- André Ooijer, Dutch football player
- André Øvredal, Norwegian film director and screenwriter
- André Parmentier (politician) (1912–1978), French
- Andre President, American National Football League (NFL) football player
- André Previn (1929–2019), German-American jazz and classical pianist, conductor and composer
- Andre Rampersad (born 1995), Trinidadian footballer
- André de Resende, Portuguese Renaissance archaeologist
- André Rebouças, Brazilian engineer and abolitionist
- André F. Richard (1906–1993), Canadian politician and businessperson
- André Rieu, Dutch violinist, orchestra conductor
- Andre Russell, Jamaican and West Indies cricketer
- Andre Rollins, Bahamian politician
- Andre Romelle Young, American musician also known as Dr. Dre
- Andre Roothman, South African actor and teacher
- André Salvat (1920–2017), French Army colonel
- Andre' Sam (born 1999), American football player
- André Sanglier (1911–1997), French politician
- André Sentenac (born 1939), French molecular biologist
- André Seznec, French engineer
- Andre Schickling German pool player
- André Schmidt (born 1989), German footballer
- André Schubert, German football player and manager
- André Schürrle, German football player
- André F. J. Scott, Canadian lawyer
- Andre Smith (linebacker), American National Football League (NFL) football player
- André Soares, Portuguese architect
- André Sollie, Flemish author and illustrator of children's literature
- André Spicer, New Zealand professor of organisational behaviour
- Andre Spitzer, Israeli 1972 Summer Olympics fencing coach and victim of the Munich massacre
- André Støylen, Norwegian politician for the Conservative Party
- Andre Strode, American National Football League (NFL) football player
- Andre Szmyt (born 1998), American football player
- André Leon Talley (1948–2022), American fashion journalist
- André the Giant (André Roussimoff), French wrestler and actor
- André Thapedi, American lawyer and politician
- Andre Tippett, American National Football League (NFL) football player
- André Travetto, French footballer
- André Trepoll (born 1977), German politician
- André Ventura, Portuguese politician
- André Villas-Boas, Portuguese football manager
- André Watts (1946–2023), American pianist
- Andre Wesson (born 1997), American basketball player
- Andre Wisdom, British football player
- André Wlodarczyk (born 1944), Polish-French linguist
- Andre Woolridge (born 1973), American basketball player
- Andre Worrell, Barbadian politician
- Andre Wyss, American paleontologist
- Andre Young, better known as Dr. Dre, American rapper and producer
- André Verbart, Dutch poet
- André Zaoui (born 1941), French physicist
- André Zwoboda, French screenwriter, film director and producer
- Sœur André, French supercentenarian (1904–2023)
- Andre Taulany, Indonesian actor and comedian

== Fictional characters ==
- André, a character in the 1984 short film The Adventures of André & Wally B.
- André, the main antagonist of the Ubisoft video game Rayman 3: Hoodlum Havoc
- André, in the 2016 film A Wedding
- Andre the blacksmith from the 3rd installment of the Fromsoft gaming series DarkSouls 3
- André Baptiste Sr., a character from the 2005 film Lord of War
- André-Baptiste Depérinconu, a character from the Belgian comic strip Le Petit Spirou
- André Bishop, the main protagonist of the Electronic Arts video game Fight Night Champion
- André Bourgeois, a character in the animated series Miraculous: Tales of Ladybug & Cat Noir
- André Camel, a fictitious FBI agent in the manga series Case Closed
- André de France, the eponymous hero from the Old French romance from the 12th century
- André Delambre, a character in the 1958 film The Fly, which was based on the namesake short story
- André DiMera, a fictional serial killer from the American soap opera Days of Our Lives
- André Grandier, one of the main characters of the manga series The Rose of Versailles
- André Harris, a character from the Nickelodeon TV series Victorious
- André Jurieux, a character in the 1939 film The Rules of the Game
- André LeBlanc (DC Comics), a supervillain who appears in American comic books published by DC Comics
- Andre Lee, a Korean-American biochemist in the American science fiction series Inside Job
- Andre Lyon, a character in the American musical drama Empire
- André Micheaux, best known as Michael Vaughn, a character in the television series Alias
- André Toulon, a character in the film series Puppet Master
- Andre Kriegman from the movie Zero Day

== Other uses ==
- André (film), a 1994 film about André the seal
- André (play), a 1798 play by William Dunlap
- André the Seal

== See also ==
- André (surname)
- Andrée – feminine form of the name
- Dre (given name), includes people named Dré
