= Avelar (surname) =

Avelar is a Portuguese municipality.

Avelar or Avellar is also a Latin-root, often Portuguese, given name and surname.

== Notable people ==
=== Avelar surname ===
- André do Avelar (c. 1546), a Portuguese astronomer
- António Avelar de Pinho (b.1947), a Portuguese writer and songwriter
- Carlos Avelar (b.1954), an American politician
- Dagmara Avelar, an Ecuatorian-American politician
- Danilo Avelar (b.1989), a Brazilian professional footballer
- Félix de Avelar Brotero (1744 – 1828), a Portuguese botanist
- Frank Avelar (b.1969), a Salvadoran professional boxer
- Idelber Avelar (b.1968), a Brazilian literary scholar
- Jose Antonio Rodríguez Avelar (1958 – 2025), a Mexican professional boxer
- José Cândido da Silveira Avelar (1843 – 1905), a Portuguese historian
- José de Avelar Rebelo (c. 1600 – 1657), a Portuguese painter
- José Ricardo Avelar (b.1998), a Brazilian professional footballer
- Karla Avelar (b.1978), a Salvadoran transgender rights activist
- Miguel González Avelar (1937 – 2011), a Mexican politician
- Socorro Avelar (1925 – 2003), a Mexican actress

=== Avelar given name ===
- Avelar Brandão Vilela (1912 – 1986), a Brazilian Cardinal

=== Avellar surname ===
- Estêvão Cardoso de Avellar (1917 – 2009), a Brazilian bishop
- José Carlos Avellar (1936 – 2016), a Brazilian film critic
- Luiz Avellar (b.1956), a Brazilian piano player
- Murílio de Avellar Hingel (1933 – 2023), a Brazilian geographer and politician
- Riquelme Avellar (b.2006), a Brazilian professional footballer

== See also ==
- Avella (disambiguation)
  - Avella, a town in southern Italy
- Corylus avellana, the common hazel
