= Zaoui (surname) =

Zaoui is a surname. Notable people with the surname include:

- Ahmed Zaoui, Algerian academic
- Amin Zaoui (born 1956), Algerian novelist
- Amine Zaoui Villar (born 2006), French-Moroccan singer-songwriter
- André Zaoui (born 1941), French physicist
- Karim Zaoui (born 1970), Algerian football manager
- Mohamed Zaoui (born 1960), Algerian boxer
- Mohamed Zaoui (footballer) (born 1980), French footballer
- Mourad Zaoui (born 1980), Moroccan actor
- Raphaël Faget-Zaoui (born 1995), French musician, member of Therapie Taxi
- Samir Zaoui (born 1976), Algerian footballer
