= Andre Campbell =

Andre Campbell may refer to:

- Andrae Campbell (born 1989), Jamaican footballer
- Andre Campbell (physician), American physician
