= Karol XVII & MB Valence =

Polish DJ and producer duo

- Genres: Deep house, electronic music
- Labels: Loco Records, Get Physical Music
- Members: Karol Samocki, Marek Bigajski

Karol XVII & MB Valence – a Polish duo of DJs and producers of electronic music – Karol Samocki (as Karol XVII) and Marek Bigajski (as MB Valence). The duo's work focuses on such genres as Deep house, Melodic House and Downtempo.

== History ==
The duo's project was created around 2006, when Karol Samocki and Marek Bigajski, who had been working under separate pseudonyms, decided to join forces. The musical hybrid of genres represented by the artists (House and Deep House) was reflected in the first joint releases that were very well received on the international market. In 2007, together with Slawek Loboda, they founded an independent music label Loco Records and led it to the title of the best Deep House label in 2010 by means of 3 tracks that appeared in the Beatport top 10 rankings. In 2008, DJ Mag awarded them the title of the best Polish DJs.

They have worked with many top artists of the world clubbing scene, such as Miguel Migs, Brian Tappert, Robert Owens, Timewriter, Ian Pooley, Jimpster, Lusine, Maya Jane Coles, Nick Curly, Jori Hulkkonen, Guy J, and Andre Lodemann. Initially, the duo's main focus was on their original tracks released on their Loco Records label. However, they also made exceptions and released their music on other smaller or much larger labels: Peppermint Jam, Toolroom, Suara as well as Armada Deep, and Ministry of Sound. In addition to their original songs, they have made remixes for foreign artists such as Miguel Migs or Maya Jane Coles.

On February 18, 2022, their long–awaited long–playing album "Essay" had its premiere. It was released on a Berlin label Get Physical Music. The album is composed of 13 songs, which gives a total of 70 minutes of music. The three vocalists involved in the project were Jono McCleery, Lazarusman, and Keely Timlin.

== Discography ==
Albums

Title	Album details
Essay	Released: February 18, 2022; Label: Get Physical Music; Formats: CD, digital download
Essay (Remixes)	Released: October 20, 2023; Label: Get Physical Music; Formats: digital download

Singles

- Drum In Peace (2006)
- Calabar (2007)
- Better Friends (2007)
- Don't Forget, Feat. Paige Central (2007)
- Deep, Deeper, Deepest (2008)
- Who I Am (2008)
- Deep, Deeper, Deepest 2 (2008)
- Deep, Deeper, Deepest Remixes (2009)
- Minor Chords (2009)
- Deep, Deeper, Deepest 3 (2009)
- Minor Chords Remixes (2010)
- Minor Chords 2 (2010)
- Minor Chords 3 (2010)
- Vintage Box (2010)
- Same Roots (2010)
- Vintage Box Remixes (2012)
- Deepandable (2012)
- You Are Way Too Young (2012)
- Plastic Age (2013)
- Communication (2013)
- Melange (2015)
- 651 (2016)
- Session 1 (2017)
- Day Session 1 (2017)
- Night Session 1 (2017)
- Taped (2018)
- Mushroom Soup 2 Fish Go Deep Remixes (2019)
- Sonus (2019)
- Aqua (2019)
- Retrospective (2020)
- Africa Triptych (2020)
- 4 Ravers EP (2021)
- Fool's Gold (2021)
- Whispers For Humanity (2021)
- Bang Bang vs Digisong (2022)
- Fool's Gold (Fur Coat Remix) (2022)
- Bang Bang (Remixes) (2022)
- Essay (Remix EP I) (2023)
- Essay (Remix EP II) (2023)

== Awards and nominations ==
- awarded by DJ Mag the title of the best Polish DJs (2008),
- nominated by Beatport for the Beatport Music Awards 2010, the best Deep House artists (2010),
- led their Loco Records label to the first place of the best-selling Deep House tracks on Beatport in the summary of the store's annual sales with the result of 3 recordings in the top ten (2010).
