= André Parmentier =

André Parmentier may refer to:

- André Parmentier (landscape architect) (1780–1830), American landscape architect
- André Parmentier (politician) (1912–1978), French politician
- André Parmentier (sport shooter) (1876–1937), French Olympic sport shooter
