= André Knevel =

Canadian concert organist (born 1950)

- Born: 13 January 1950 (age 75); Bussum, Netherlands
- Genres: Classical
- Occupations: Organist, arranger, organ and piano teacher
- Instrument(s): Pipe organ, piano
- Years active: 1969–present
- Labels: Vista, Jubal Records, Mirasound, STH Records, Audiocraft Productions
- Website: andreknevel.com

André Knevel (born 13 January 1950) is a Canadian concert organist, arranger, accompanist and organ teacher. He performs the works of major organ composers and also improvises on well-known themes and hymn melodies.

== Early life and education ==
Knevel was born in Bussum, Netherlands, to Gerrit Knevel, an architect and Dirkje Willemijndje Knevel-Slot, a homemaker. He started taking organ and piano lessons at eight years old. His performed his first official organ recital at age 19, and was appointed as church organist in Hilversum.

After migrating to Canada in 1975, Knevel took up residence in St. Catharines, Ontario. His Royal Conservatory studies were completed with Dr. John Tuttle, associate professor of the University of Toronto.

== Career ==
Knevel has given recitals in Canada, United States, Germany, Russia, Poland, Czech Republick, Europe, and South Africa. Each summer, he tours in the Netherlands, where he performs between 30 and 40 concerts on many of the large pipe organs in the country. He has also given recitals on the organs of Wittenberg and Torgau in Germany and in the cathedrals of Bucharest and Timișoara, Romania.

Knevel is the regular organist of the Mattaniah Christian Male Choir from Dundas, Ontario and a frequent guest organist for other choirs, including Musica Sacra Chorus and the Ottawa Carleton Male Choir, among others. He has served as an accompanist for solo instruments such as flute, panflute, violin, harp and piano. He regularly records and performs with panflutist Liselotte Rokyta

Knevel has published 30 organ solo recordings and contributed to many other recordings with choirs and other solo instrumentalists. Fellow organists Lenard Verkamman and Pieter Heykoop have both worked as registration assistants for several of André's recordings.

Knevel maintains a full teaching schedule for both organ and piano at his home and in several nearby private schools.

== Discography ==
=== Solo ===
- St. Catherines – in concert, 1975, Heidebrecht Recording Service AK 2778
- Hamilton, 1978, Heidebrecht Recording Service AK 002
- Maassluis – Loofd God Met Bazuingeklank, 1979, Vista VRS 1701
- Nijmegen, 1981, Jubal ZV 8131
- Kampen, 1982, Jubal ZV 8239
- Breda, 1984, Jubal ZV 8555
- Amsterdam & Bolsward, 1985, De Bazuin MC 8638
- Amsterdam, 1985, S.T.B. 220 249
- Bolsward, 1986, Mirasound MO 20.4021
- Hasselt, 1987, Mirasound MO 39.9012
- Arnhem, 1989, Mirasound MO 39.9031
- Dordrecht, 1990, Mirasound MO 39.9054
- Zaltbommel, 1991, Mirasound MO 399077
- Den Haag, 1992, Mirasound MO 399117
- Kampen – speelt op verzoek, 1994, STH CD 19334
- Bolsward – 25 jaar, 1995, STH CD 19365
- Amersfoort – Feike Asma André Knevel, 1997, STH CD 197022
- Grimsby – Opus 189, 2003, Audiocraft Productions Crescendo CD 9024
- In Concert Volume 1, 2003, STH CD 1403052
- Welzalig Hij Die In Der Bozen Raad Volume 1, 2004, STH CD 1404862
- Dat Op Uw Klacht De Hemel Scheure Volume 2, 2004, STH CD 1404872
- Groot En Eeuwig Opperwezen Volume 3, 2005, STH CD 1405882
- Genâ, O God Genâ, Hoor Mijn Gebeên Volume 4, 2005, STH CD 1405892
- Men Voer' Dien God Geschenken Aan Volume 5, 2005, STH CD 1405902
- In Concert Volume 2, 2006, STH CD 1406452
- Music of Praise & Meditation, Volume 1, 2006, Audiocraft Productions Crescendo CD 9045
- Komt, Laat Ons Samen Isrels HEER' Volume 6, 2008, STH CD 1408912
- God Heb Ik Lief Want Die Getrouwe Heer Volume 7, 2009, STH CD 1409922
- Looft Den Heer' Want Hij Is Goed Volume 8, 2011, STH CD 1411932
- Amazing Grace – 40 years organist, 2010, STH CD 1410092

=== Ensemble ===
- Let The Mountains Shout, Jubal Records JJ 001 (with Brampton Christian Choral Society)
- He Touched Me, Sharon Records SRN 3027 (with Ontario Christian Music Assembly)
- Classical Duets, 1981, World Records WRC 1-1876 (with Eleonore Krullaarts)
- Sing Unto The Lord With The Voice Of A Psalm, (with NRC Choir St. Catherines)
- Aloud Proclaim His Praise, Audiocraft Productions (with Hosanna Choir)
- Mommy Loves Me, This I Know, 1993, Crescendo CC CD 930729
- Heathen Lands and Hostile Peoples, 1993, Crescendo CC CD 930807 (with NRC Choir Chilliwack)
- Christian Festival Concert 1994, Audiocraft Productions Crescendo 86 (with Ontario Christian Music Assembly)
- Our World Of Music – A Prayer, 1995, Crescendo CC CD 950228
- Unto The Lord Lift Thankful Voices, 1995, STH CC CD 950808 (with Mattaniah Christian Male Choir)
- Glory To God In The Highest, 1996, STH CC CD 960628 (with Mattaniah Christian Male Choir)
- The City Of Light, 1997, STH CC CD 197052 (with Mattaniah Christian Male Choir)
- Men Sing Thy Praise, O God Volume 1, 1997, STH CC CD 197053 (with Mattaniah Christian Male Choir)
- Panflute Melodies Volume 1, 1999, STH CD 1499272 (with Liselotte Rokyta)
- Great Is Thy Name O Lord, 1999, STH CC CD 1499402 (with Mattaniah Christian Male Choir)
- Men Sing Thy Praise, O God Volume 2, 1999, STH CC CD 1499552 (with Mattaniah Christian Male Choir)
- Christian Festival Concert 1999, Audiocraft Productions Crescendo CD (with Ontario Christian Music Assembly)
- Songs Of Adoration Bring, 2000, STH CC CD 1400402 (with Mattaniah Christian Male Choir)
- Christian Festival Concert 2000, Audiocraft Productions Cres CD (with Ontario Christian Music Assembly)
- Instrumental Melodies, 2001, STH CD 1401442 (with Stephanie Numan Scholman & Andrew Knevel)
- Come, Bless The Lord, 2001, STH CC CD 1401452 (with Mattaniah Christian Male Choir)
- Men Sing Thy Praise, O God Volume 3, 2001, STH CC CD 1401462 (with Mattaniah Christian Male Choir)
- From Sea To Utmost Sea, 2001, STH CC CD 1402452 (with Mattaniah Christian Male Choir)
- A World Of Music, 2001 (with Ottawa Carleton Male Choir)
- Christian Festival Concert 2001, Audiocraft Productions Cres CD (with Ontario Christian Music Assembly)
- Christian Festival Concert 2002, Audiocraft Productions Cres CD (with Ontario Christian Music Assembly)
- Christian Festival Concert 2003, Audiocraft Productions Cres CD (with Ontario Christian Music Assembly)
- Consider the House Of The Lord, 2004, STH CC CD 1404402 (with Mattaniah Christian Male Choir)
- Geloofd Met Psalmgezang, 2004, VVR 040902 (Samenzang)
- Door Ijver Aangespoord, 2004, VVR 040903 (with Laudate Deum)
- Christian Festival Concert 2004, Audiocraft Productions Cres CD (with Ontario Christian Music Assembly)
- Christian Festival Concert 2005, Audiocraft Productions Cres CD (with Ontario Christian Music Assembly)
- Panflute Melodies Volume 2, 2006, STH CD 1406442 (with Liselotte Rokyta)
- International Trio, 2006, STH CD 1406632 (with Liselotte Rokyta & Jan Elsenaar)
- Christian Festival Concert 2006, Audiocraft Productions (with Ontario Christian Music Assembly)
- O'ral Is Mij God, 2007, VVR 070810 (with Liselotte Rokyta & Jan Elsenaar)
- Prayer For Grace, 2007, STH CC CD 1407562 (with Mattaniah Christian Male Choir)
- Children's Songs, 2007, STH CD 1407602 (with Liselotte Rokyta)
- Panflute Melodies Volume 3, 2008, STH CD 1408442 (with Liselotte Rokyta)
- Panflute Melodies Volume 4 Sacred, 2009, STH CD 1409442 (with Liselotte Rokyta)
- The Banner Of The Cross, 2009, STH CC CD 1409562 (with Mattaniah Christian Male Choir)
- Panflute Melodies Volume 5, 2010, STH CD 1410442 (with Liselotte Rokyta)
- Panflute Melodies Volume 6, 2011, STH CD 1411442 (with Liselotte Rokyta)
- With A Joyful Song, 2011, STH CC CD 1411512 (with Mattaniah Christian Male Choir)
- Panflute Melodies Volume 7 Christmas, 2012, STH CD 1412442 (with Liselotte Rokyta)

== Sheet music ==
Knevel has issued the following Dutch chorale preludes and organ solos in sheet music, which typically originate as improvisations from recordings, and are later transcribed for publication. They are published in both standard notation as well as in klavarskribo

- Willemsen 828: Toccata in G Minor
- Ambitus 18: Abide With Me, Psalm 150
- Ambitus 31: Neem Heer' Mij Beide Handen, Gouden Harpen Ruisen, Psalm 97
- Ambitus 40: Rondo In G Major
- Ambitus 61: The Lord's My Shepherd
- Ambitus 63: Teach Me Thy Way, As The Deer, All Through The Night
- Cantique 190: Psalm 75
- Cantique 205: Wie Maar De Goede God Laat Zorgen
- Cantique 280: Psalm 138, Lead Me Lord, Ere Zij Aan God De Vader
- Cantique 282: Alle Roem Is Uitgesloten, I Will Sing Of My Redeemer
- Cantique 287: Psalm 42, How Great Thou Art
- Cantique 299: Theme from Beethoven's 9th Symphony
- Cantique 365: Psalm 68, Psalm 79, Vaste Rots Van Mijn Behoud
- Cantique 368: Psalm 25, Doorgrond Mijn Hart En Ken Mijn Weg O Heer, Een Vaste Burg Is Onze God
- Cantique 376: Psalm 77, Ik Ga Slapen Ik Ben Moe, 'k Wil U O God Mijn Dank Betalen
- Cantique 384: Canadian And Dutch Anthems
- Cantique 392: Op Bergen En In Dalen, Op U Mijn Heiland Blijf Ik Hopen
- Cantique 395: Heugelijke Tijding, Rule Brittania
- Cantique 404: Psalm 118, God Roept Ons Broeders Tot De Daad
- Cantique 408: Psalm 108, Rijst Op Rijst Op Voor Jezus
