= Twixlum =

- District of Emden
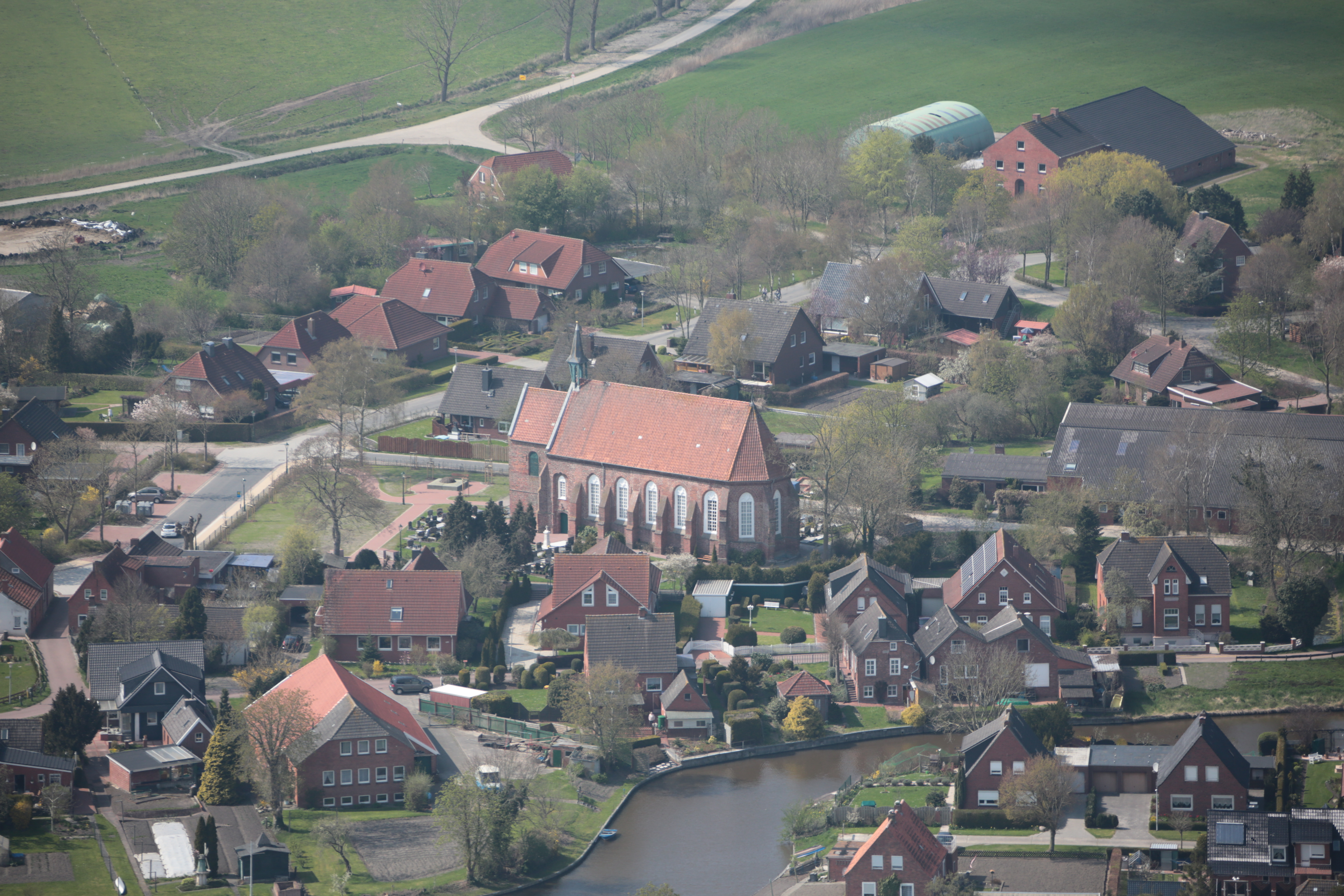
- Aerial view of Twixlum

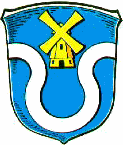
- Coat of arms

- Location of Twixlum within Emden
- Interactive map of Twixlum
- Location within Germany Location within Lower Saxony
- Coordinates: 53.37310°N 7.13374°E
- Country: Germany
- State: Lower Saxony
- City: Emden
- Elevation: 1 m (3.3 ft)

Population
  - Metro: 993
- Time zone: UTC+01:00 (CET)
  - Summer (DST): UTC+02:00 (CEST)
- Dialling codes: 04921
- Vehicle registration: 26723

Twixlum is a village in Lower Saxony, Germany. Located to the northwest of the city, it is administratively a district (Stadtteil) of Emden. The village was incorporated as such on 1 July 1972, as were the villages of Logumer Vorwerk and Wybelsum.

Twixlum has retained its village character. In the center of the village is the village church. The current church was built around 1500. The tower, which is lower than the church, is a remnant of an older church that was probably built in the fourteenth century.
