= Wybelsum =

- District of Emden
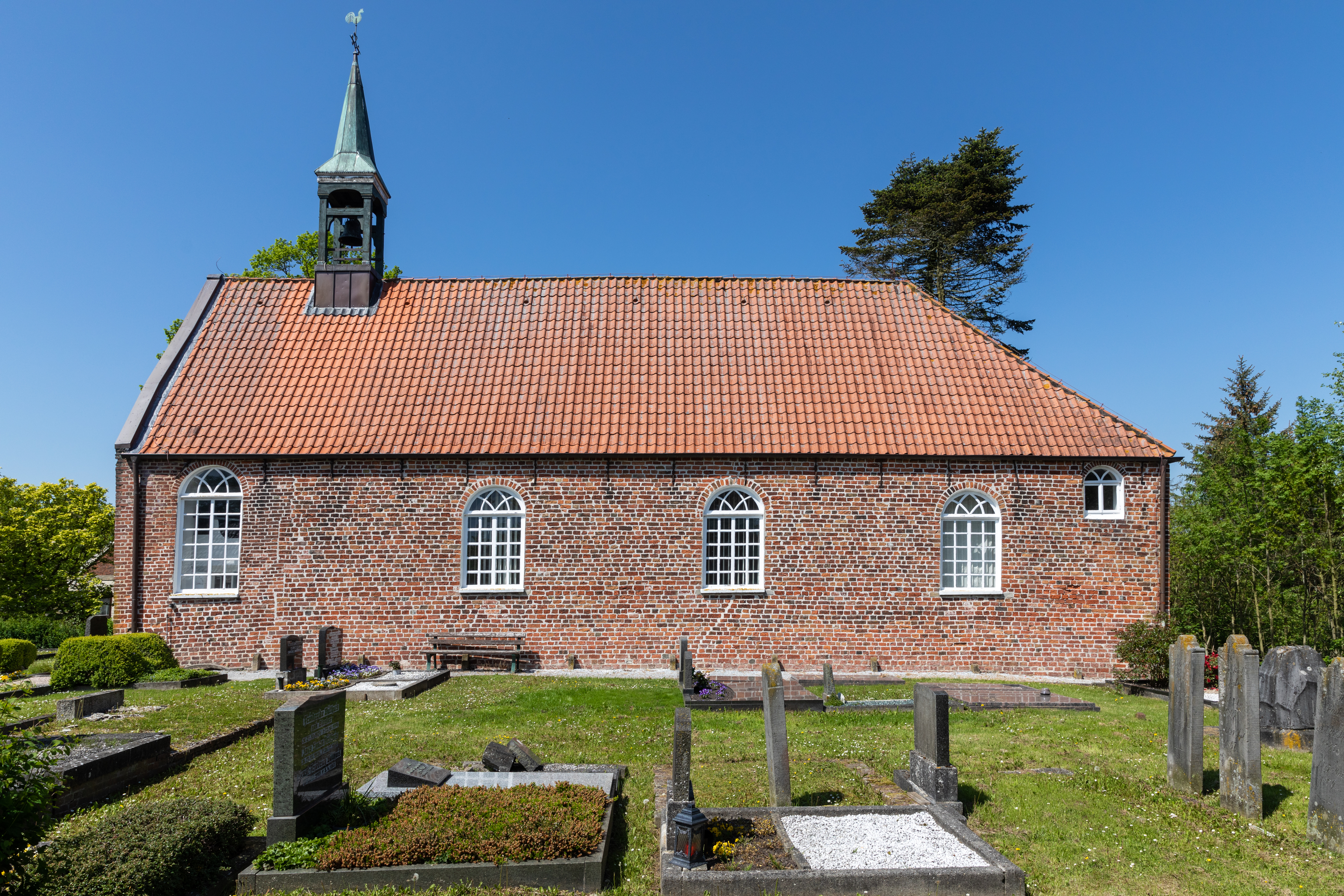
- Wybelsum Church

- Coat of arms

- Location of Wybelsum within Emden
- Interactive map of Wybelsum
- Location within Germany Location within Lower Saxony
- Coordinates: 53.35153°N 7.10627°E
- Country: Germany
- State: Lower Saxony
- City: Emden
- Elevation: 1 m (3.3 ft)

Population
  - Metro: 1,456
- Time zone: UTC+01:00 (CET)
  - Summer (DST): UTC+02:00 (CEST)
- Dialling codes: 04921; 04927
- Vehicle registration: 26723

Wybelsum is a village in Lower Saxony, Germany. Located to the west of the city, it is administratively a district (Stadtteil) of Emden. The village was incorporated as such on 1 July 1972, as were the villages of Logumer Vorwerk and Twixlum.

The village was mentioned in a document in 1348 as Wivelsum, probably a combination of the nickname Wifel and the suffix -um ('home'), therefore meaning "Wifel's home".

The village has a church from 1700, which replaced the church of the village of Geerdsweer, which was abandoned after a storm surge in 1699.

== Gallery ==
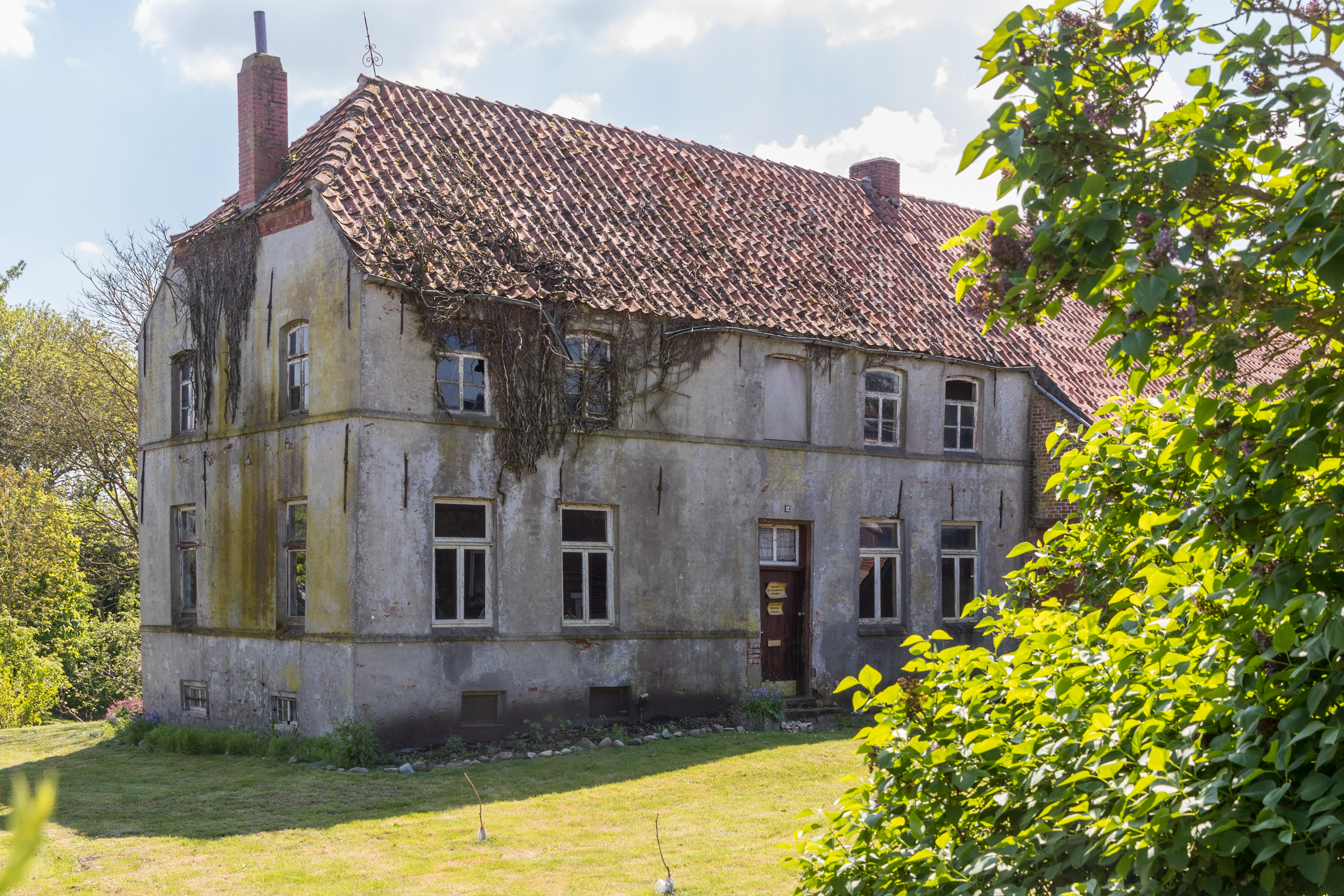
Monumental house

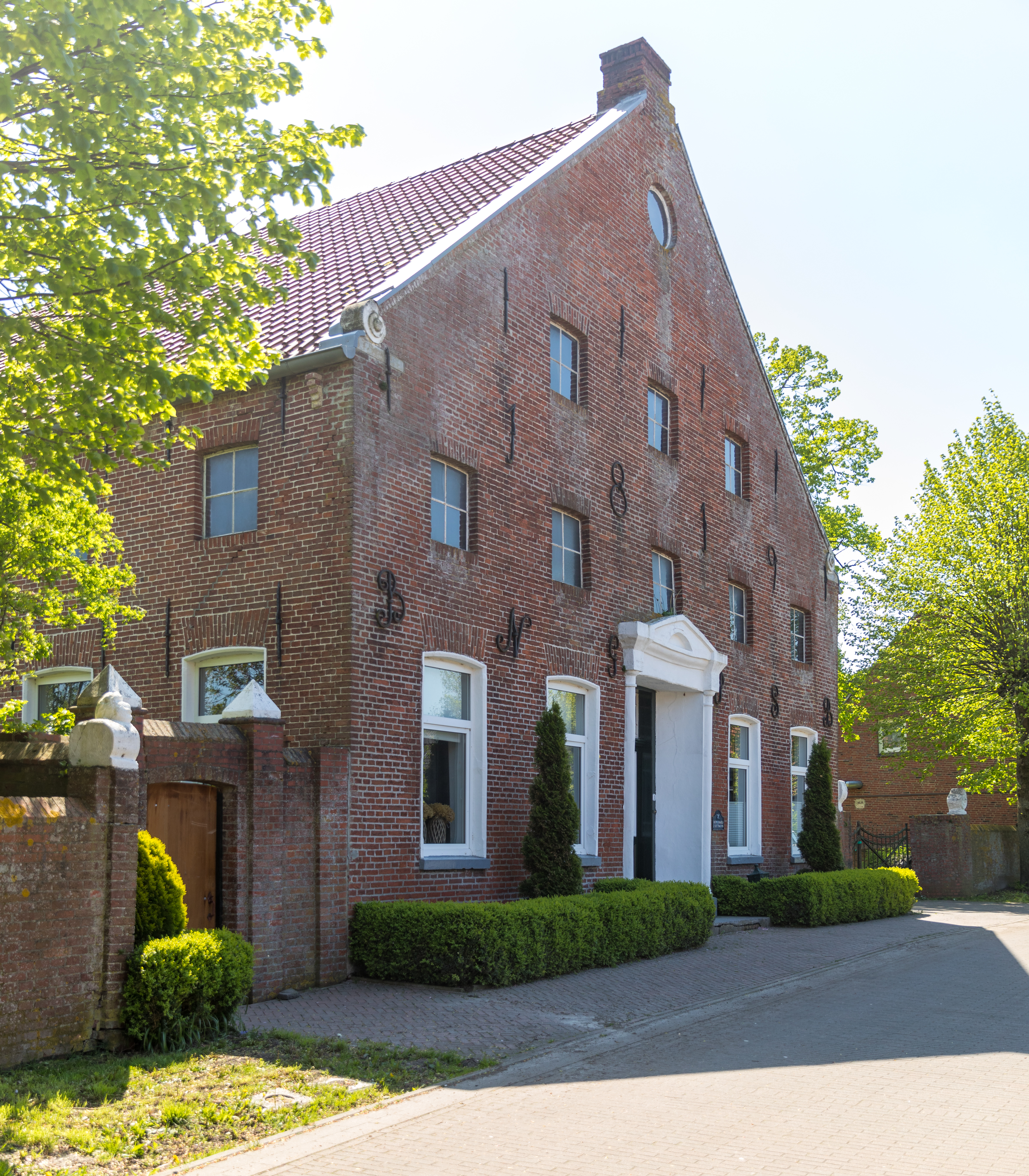
Monumental house

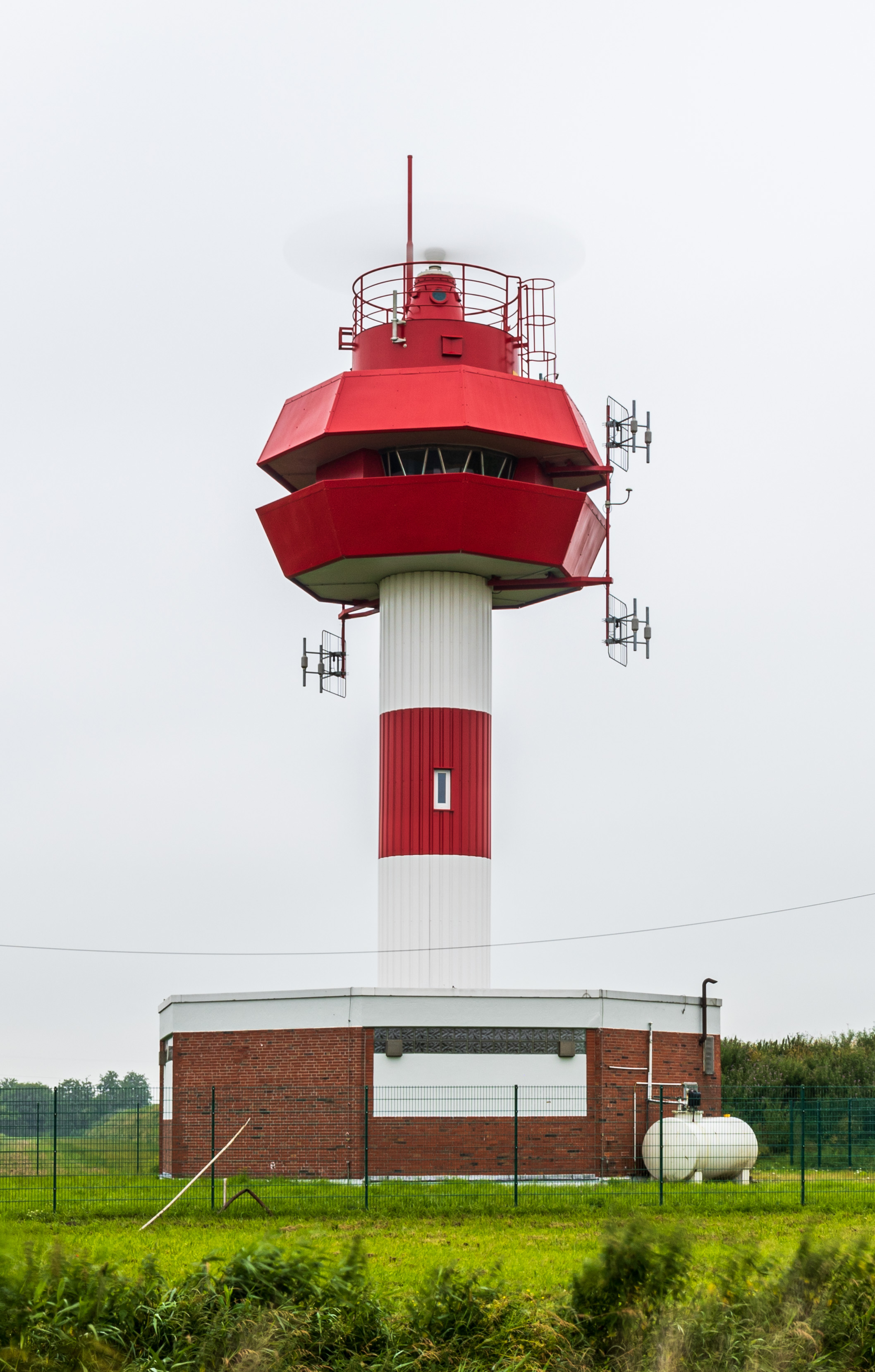
Wybelsum lighthouse

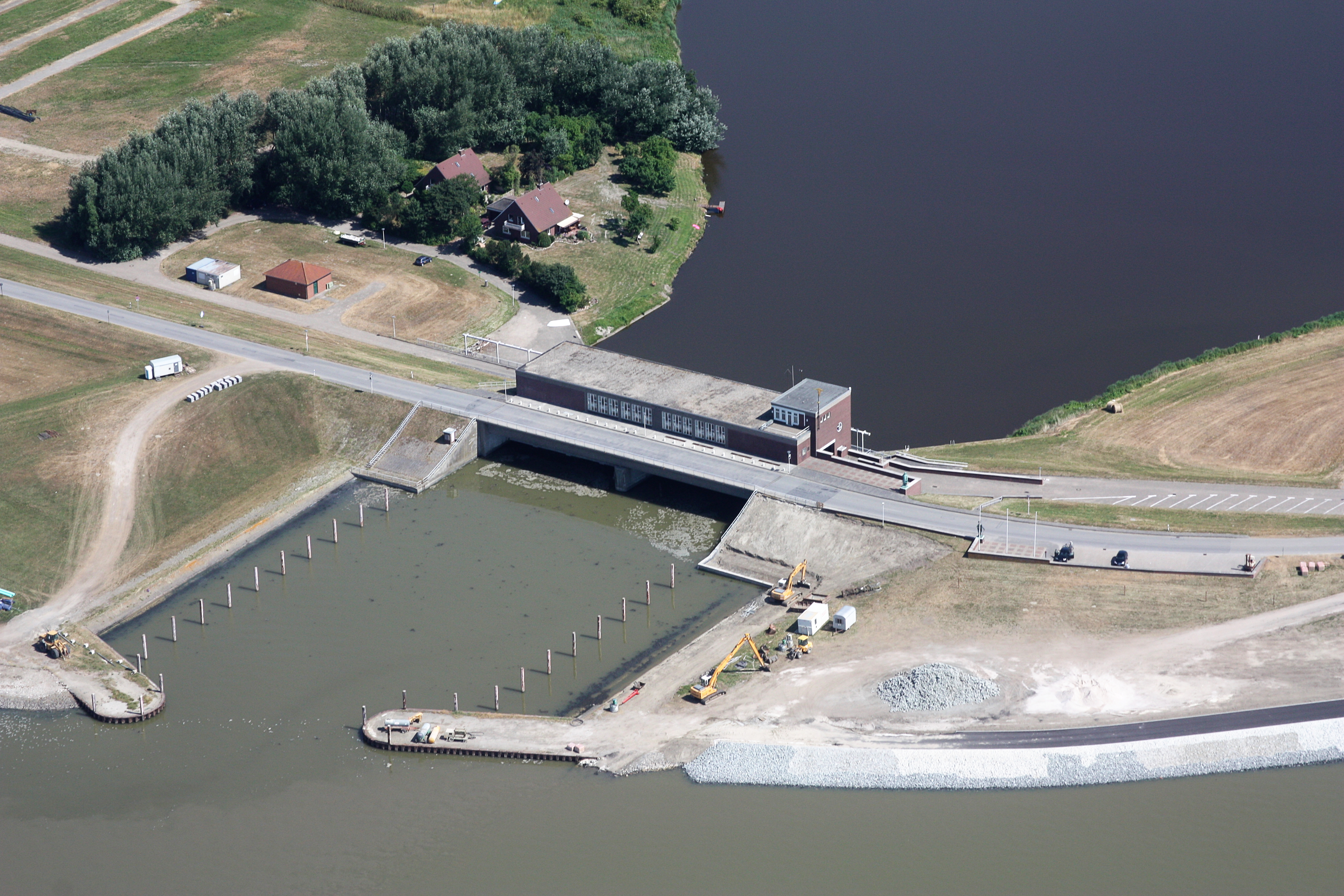
Lock near Wybelsum

== Notable people ==
- André Krzatala (born 1990), professional football player
