= Logumer Vorwerk =

- District of Emden
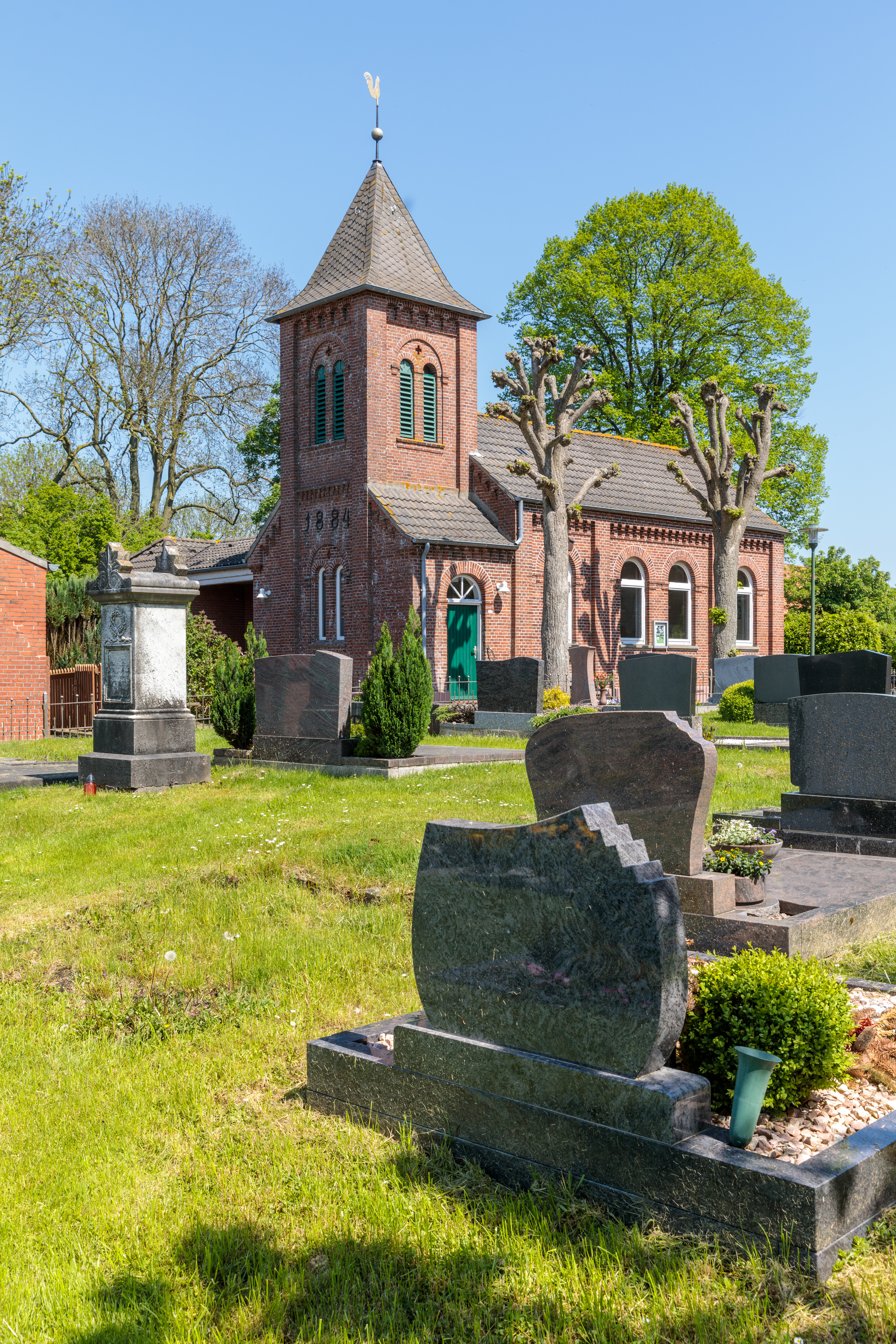
- Logumer Vorwerk Church

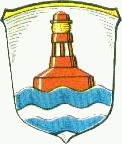
- Coat of arms

- Location of Logumer Vorwerk within Emden
- Interactive map of Logumer Vorwerk
- Location within Germany Location within Lower Saxony
- Coordinates: 53.35133°N 7.13288°E
- Country: Germany
- State: Lower Saxony
- City: Emden
- Elevation: 1 m (3.3 ft)

Population
  - Metro: 226
- Time zone: UTC+01:00 (CET)
  - Summer (DST): UTC+02:00 (CEST)
- Dialling codes: 04921
- Vehicle registration: 26723

Logumer Vorwerk is a village in Lower Saxony, Germany. Located to the west of the city, it is administratively a district (Stadtteil) of Emden. The village was incorporated as such on 1 July 1972, as were the villages of Wybelsum and Twixlum.

The village is named after the former village of Logum that drowned in the Dollart.
