= André Latarjet =

French physician

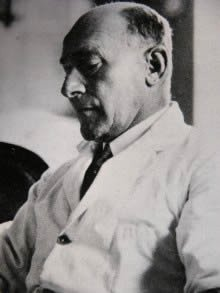
- Born: 20 August 1877; Dijon, France
- Died: 4 May 1947 (aged 69); Lyon, France
- Education: Medicine
- Occupations: Sports Doctor, Surgeon
- Years active: 1890s- 1940s
- Known for: 1st elected President of the FIMS

André Latarjet (1877–1947) was a French physician. In 1933, at the 2nd International AIMS (FIMS) Congress, he was elected President of the organization which would become the International Federation of Sports Medicine, the World agency for sports medicine.
