= White Coats for Black Lives =

American nonprofit organization

White Coats for Black Live
- Type: Non-profit organization
- Location: United States
- Affiliations: Black Lives Matter
- Website: whitecoats4blacklives.org

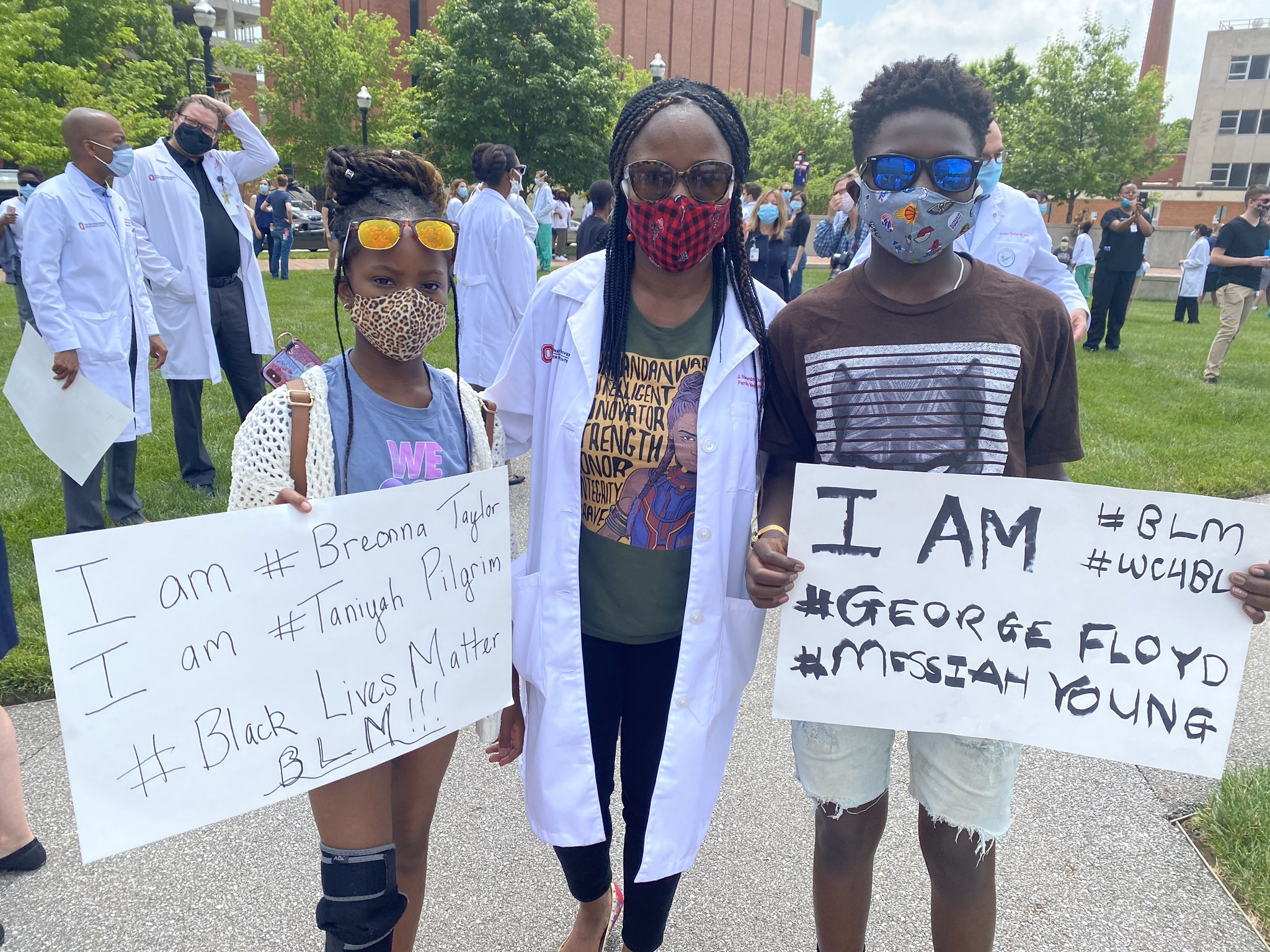
White Coats for Black Lives rally in Columbus, Ohio, in 2020.

White Coats for Black Lives (also known as WhiteCoats4BlackLives and WC4BL) is a nonprofit social justice student organization based in the United States. Founded in 2014 in response to the Black Lives Matter movement, WC4BL supports efforts to fight racism in medicine and health care.

The organization participates in and organized protests against systemic racism at medical schools and the health care system in general, including protests in support of the end of police brutality in the wake of the murder of George Floyd. WC4BL members and supporters often wear white coats during events. Some events take the form of walkouts or die-ins.

WC4BL operates chapters at medical schools throughout the United States.
