= Mohamed Zaoui (footballer) =

French footballer (born 1980)

Personal information
- Date of birth: 11 February 1980 (age 46)
- Place of birth: Saint-Denis, France
- Height: 1.76 m (5 ft 9 in)
- Position: Midfielder

Senior career*
Years	Team	Apps	(Gls)
1998–2001	Gueugnon	3	(0)
2008	US Joué-lès-Tours		
2009–2012	Villemomble Sports	54+	(3+)
- * Club domestic league appearances and goals

Mohamed Zaoui (born 11 February 1980) is a French former professional footballer who played as a midfielder. He played on the professional level in Ligue 2 for FC Gueugnon.
