= Andre Jones =

Andre Jones may refer to:

- Andre Jones (defensive back) (born 1985), American football player
- Andre Jones (linebacker) (1969–2011), American football player
- Andre Jones Jr. (born 1998), American football player
- Andre Jones and Freddie Tiller (born 1956), American serial killers
