= Klavarskribo =

Music notation system

Klavarskribo (sometimes shortened to klavar) is a music notation system that was introduced in 1931 by the Dutchman Cornelis Pot (1885–1977). The name means "keyboard writing" in Esperanto. It differs from conventional music notation in a number of ways and is intended to be easily readable.

== History ==
Cornelis Pot came from a family of shipbuilders and was managing director of Smit Slikkerveer, a factory which made dynamos for ships. He had also a passion for music and wanted to others to be able to enjoy music by playing and by singing. He studied alternative music notations and from them developed his idea of Klavarskribo. He expected the music world to embrace his invention but was disappointed when that proved not to be the case. Having the financial means, Pot was able by himself to start and publish written courses and have music transcribed.

In the 1930s the number of klavar users grew enormously and much sheet music was transcribed and published in the klavar notation. During World War II these activities stopped, but afterwards Pot started with a new élan. His Klavarskribo Institute expanded so much as to employ fifty people at one time. Courses in English, French and German were offered.

The Klavarskribo Foundation was established after Pot’s death in 1977 in Ridderkerk (near Rotterdam) with limited financial means. The foundation is concerned with transcribing and publishing music mainly for church organists, an important supportive group. Also written courses for a number of instruments, including guitar, accordion, recorder and in particular piano, and other keyboard instruments, are available. There are more than 10,000 klavar notation users in the Netherlands and abroad.

== Notation ==
A keyboard with the stave growing out of it

A melody with the note stems pointing to the right, indicating that the right hand should be used

A measure in three-time with bar lines and count lines

The klavar notation distinguishes itself from conventional notation in several ways.

The stave on which the notes are written is vertical so the music is read from top to bottom. Each note has its own individual position, low notes on the left and high notes on the right as on the piano. This stave consists of groups of two and three vertical lines corresponding to the black keys (notes) of the piano. White notes are written in the seven white spaces between the lines. Therefore sharps and flats are no longer needed, as each note has its own place in the octave. The evident correspondence between the stave and a piano induced Pot to use the name Klavarskribo. Though the klavar notation is a universal notation that can be used for all instruments and for singing, its greatest advantage is for instruments where a number of notes have to be played simultaneously: the keyboard instruments.

Duration and rhythm are shown graphically. A piece of music is divided into bars of equal length, which are subdivided into “counts” or beats. Short horizontal bar lines show the division between the bars, dotted lines indicate the counts. All notes are provided with stems—stems to the right: play with the right hand, stems to the left: left hand. These are placed so as to indicate in the measuring system exactly when a note must be played or sung. A note always lasts till the next one of the same hand or part appears, unless a stop sign or continuation dot is used. Therefore there is no connection between shape or colour of a note and its duration. The various kinds of 'rest' signs, different note heads, ties and different clefs are thus rendered unnecessary.

The klavar notation uses one clef: the centre of the keyboard is indicated by dotted lines representing C♯ and D♯, so Middle C can easily be located. There are no different clefs for the left and right hand.

This design enables the player to see clearly, after a short explanation, how the notation 'works', so that a beginner can start playing almost immediately. The player can see exactly which note or chord to play and which hand to use.

Klavar is not only for beginners; even difficult pieces by Chopin and Liszt are available in the klavar notation. The Klavarskribo Foundation has transcribed more than 25,000 pieces and provides catalogues for the piano, reed organ, accordion, orchestra, electronic organ, keyboard and guitar. In addition to transcription, the PC software KlavarScript enables music in the traditional notation to be transcribed to the klavar notation through MIDI files, scanning, or playing through a MIDI keyboard.

== Organizations ==
In the Netherlands the Klavarskribo Foundation and the Klavar Vereniging Nederland (Dutch Klavar Union) are the two main organizations. The latter, active since 1978, has 800 members and its objective is, in cooperation with the Foundation, to promote and preserve the klavar notation. The Union keeps a register of teachers in the Netherlands who are willing to teach the klavar system. It tries to stimulate klavar users to take lessons from these teachers in order to improve their level of playing.

Both the Klavarskribo Foundation and the Dutch Klavar Union consider it their task to point out to those who wish to make music, or who are starting to do so, the advantages of using the klavar notation.
