= André Dieudonné Berre =

Gabonese politician

André Dieudonné Berre (born 3 September 1940) is a Gabonese politician. He served in the government of Gabon from 1990 to 2003 and was the Mayor of Libreville, the capital and largest city, from 2003 to 2007. He is a member of the Gabonese Democratic Party (Parti démocratique gabonais, PDG) and is currently a Deputy in the National Assembly of Gabon.

== Political career ==
Born in Lambaréné, Berre became a geologist and was Deputy Director-General of the Shell Gabon oil company during the 1970s. He was then Director-General of Shell Gabon from 1977 to 1990. In late May 1990, following riots in Port-Gentil that were sparked by the mysterious death of opposition leader Joseph Rendjambé, Berre complained that "the rioters systematically destroyed the infrastructure that we have invested many years to create". Berre entered the government as Minister of Trade and Industry later in 1990. He remained in that post until March 1994, when he was instead appointed as Minister of the Economy, Planning, Reform of the Parastatal Sector, and Privatization. He was then moved to the post of Minister of Trade, Industry, Small and Medium-Sized Industries, and the Craft Industry, in charge of the Reform of the Parastatal Sector and Privatization, in October 1994. He was instead appointed as Minister of Higher Education, Research, and Technological Innovation, in charge of Relations with the Constitutional Assemblies, in 1999.

As a PDG candidate in Libreville, Berre won a seat in the National Assembly in the December 2001 parliamentary election. He remained in the government after the election and was moved to the position of Minister of Communication, Posts, and Information Technologies on 27 January 2002. Following the December 2002 local elections, he was elected as Mayor of Libreville on 19 January 2003, receiving the votes of 91 out of 97 municipal councillors; Mehdi Teale was then appointed to replace him as Minister of Communication. When Hu Jintao, the President of the People's Republic of China, visited Gabon in early February 2004, Berre designated him as an honorary citizen of Libreville and gave him a ceremonial key to the city. In late 2004, he banned the sale of drugs in Libreville's streets, describing it as "a harmful and illegal practice".

In the December 2006 parliamentary election, Berre was elected to the National Assembly, winning the first seat from the First Arrondissement of Libreville. Because parliamentary deputies in Gabon are not allowed to hold any other elected office, Berre stepped down as Mayor of Libreville so that he could retain his seat in the National Assembly, and Alexandre Ayo-Barro was elected to succeed him as Mayor in May 2007.

Berre is a member of the Political Bureau of the PDG as of 2007. Following the death of President Omar Bongo in June 2009, Berre stressed stability and continuity: "Gabon is being governed. The ministers are here and doing their work. I'm in the (National) Assembly and we are legislating. All the other institutions are working."
