= Andre Finkelstein =

French chemist (1923–2013)

André Maurice Finkelstein (14 May 1923 – 10 September 2013) was a French chemist who served as the deputy director general of the IAEA from 1969 to 1973. He was also a high-ranking official in the Commissariat à l’Énergie Atomique (CEA), the French government's oversight body civilian and military nuclear activities.

== Biography ==
Finkelstein was born in Saint-Maur-des-Fossés in Paris on 14 May 1923. As a graduate student, he studied physical chemistry, spending two years at the University of Rochester and joined the CEA in 1953 after earning his Ph.D. He originally studied tritium, a radioactive isotope of hydrogen, in a CEA lab. When the CEA expanded in 1958, Finkelstein became a senior officer in the department of external relations and programs. While serving in this role, Finkelstein participated in conferences in Geneva on the peaceful use of nuclear energy and served as advisor and alternate to the French representative to the IAEA. In 1967, he was promoted to deputy director in the cabinet of the high commissioner. He also worked in collaboration with the European Nuclear Energy Agency (ENEA).

In 1969, Finkelstein became deputy director general in charge of research and isotopes at the IAEA, where he held until 1973. In 1974, Finkelstein returned to the CEA to become deputy commissioner of the mission for nuclear safety and protection. The CEA promoted him to secretary of the central commission for nuclear installation safety (commission centrale de sûreté des installations atomiques, CSSIA) within the same year. Finklestein later served as coordinator of archives and history at the CEA from 1983 until his retirement on July 1, 1988.

Finkelstein later returned to France, where he died in Saint-Maur-des-Fossés on 10 September 2013, at the age of 90.

== Bibliography ==
Cohen, Avner. "The Avner Cohen Collection." André Finkelstein. NPIHP, The Woodrow Wilson Center for International Scholars, 03 Oct. 2013. Web. 05 Nov. 2013. https://www.wilsoncenter.org/andre-finkelstein
