= Andre Roothman =

South African actor and teacher

André Roothman
- Born: André Roothman; Cape Town, South Africa
- Other name: Andre Roddtman
- Education: University of Stellenbosch
- Occupations: Actor, Teacher
- Years active: 1978–present
- Height: 182 cm (6 ft 0 in)

André Roothman, also known as Andre Roddtman, is a South African actor and teacher. In a career spanning more than four decades, Roothman had made several notable roles in theatre, cinema and television. He is best known for the roles in the films; Consequence, Charlie Jade, Cape Town as well as Arende franchise and soap operas 7de Laan and Arendsvlei.

== Personal life ==
Roothman was born in Cape Town, South Africa. In 1978, he graduated from the University of Stellenbosch with a BA degree.

On 10 December 2011, Andre along with his friend Uys Winterbagh, 34, from Oranjezicht, departed from the De Hoop Nature Reserve and were headed towards Cape Infanta by a double sea kayak. However, their craft capsized in the big sea conditions and they were unable to get back into it. On the next day, NSRI Agulhas and NSRI Witsand volunteer duty crews with the Overberg Fire and Rescue helicopter, a Squirrel B2, rescued them.

== Career ==
After graduation, he worked as a teacher at Cloetesville Secondary School in Cape Town. Then he joined the Cape Performing Arts Council (CAPAB) in 1983 as a performing artist. Meanwhile, he joined theatre productions for Ben Dehaeck and the Little Libertas Theater. At this time in the 1970s, he joined with the community-based satirical theater called The Breughel Theater. In 1983, as a professional actor he performed in the stage plays such as; Provost in Measure for Measure, and Maynardville (1987). In 1995, he won the Vita Award for his role in Reza de Wet's stage play Drif and later had Fleur du Cap nominations as Best Supporting Actor in two productions of Drif, one for CAPAB in 1994 and the other for Dubbelpunt Produksies in 2015.

In 1978, he entered cinema, but not as an actor, where he was the clapper loader of the technical crew for the film Die Spaanse Vlieg. Then in 1986, he appeared in the direct-to-video film Heroes with an uncredited role. In the same year, he made the television debut with the serial Ou Grote and played the supportive role "Charlie Steyn". In the next year, he made his first film role of "Head Regulator" in the 1978 film Survivor.

In 1992, he joined with the Arende television franchise serial and played the role "P.J. Buys" in both part II (Arende II: MoordenaarsKaroo in 1992) and part III (Arende III: Dorsland in 1993). After the huge success of the serial, it was later made into a film in 1994 with the same title Arende where Roothman reprised his role. In 1998, he appeared in the SABC2 Afrikaans television serial Voete van Goud. In the 2000s, he performed in the stage plays such as; Die Goue Seun (KKNK 2002), My Zinc Bed (2005), Mooi Maria (2011), Moeder Moed en Haar Kinders (Aardklop and KKNK 2014 and 2015), and Die Nag van Legio at Innibos in 2017. In 2002, he acted in the American comedy film Home Alone 4: Taking Back the House.

== Filmography ==
Year	Film	Role	Genre	Ref.
1978	Die Spaanse Vlieg	Clapper loader	Film	
1986	Heroes		TV movie	
1986	Ou Grote	Charlie Steyn	TV series	
1987	Survivor	Head Regulator	Film	
1989	Cape Rebel	P.J. Buys	TV series	
1989	Vleuels	Commandant 27th Squadron	TV series	
1992	Arende II: MoordenaarsKaroo	P.J. Buys	TV series	
1993	Ballade vir 'n Enkeling II	Emile Human	TV series	
1993	Die Sonkring II	Willem Pretorius	TV series	
1993	The Gospel According to Matthew	Disciple	Film	
1993	Arende III: Dorsland	P.J. Buys	TV series	
1994	Arende	P.J. Buys	Film	
1995	Die Laksman	Rudolf Muller	TV series	
1995	The Secret Force	Newscaster	Film	
1996	Meeulanders	Jacob Langhans	TV movie	
1997	Kaalgat Tussen die Daisies	Sgt. Jorrie Jooste	Film	
1998	Voete van Goud	Geert Rademan	TV movie	
1999	An Angel for Chloé	Van Linden	TV movie	
2001	Lied van die Lappop	Dr. Gregoir Kannemeyer	TV mini series	
2001	Mein Papa mit der kalten Schnauze	Herrchen von 'Bismarck'	TV movie	
2001	The Diamond Hunters	Victor Celeste	TV mini series	
2002	The Wonderful World of Disney	King	TV series	
2002	Global Effect	Doctor Bennett	Film	
2002	Home Alone 4: Taking Back the House	King	Film	
2002	Pavement	Professor Taric	TV movie	
2003	Consequence	Crawley	Film	
2003	Dissonances	Peter	Film	
2004	Charlie	Gordon Winter	Film	
2005	Charlie Jade	Horace Ipstak	TV series	
2005	Known Gods	Jansen	TV series	
2005	Out on a Limb	Officer Jim	Film	
2000	To Be First	David Prince	Film	
2008	Transito	Donkerman	TV series	
2008	7de Laan	Cas van Graan	TV series	
2012	Verraaiers	Kommandant Christiaan Douthwaite	Film	
2012	Wolwedans in die Skemer	Jan, Diana's husband	Film	
2013	Zulu	Tony Montgomery	Film	
2016	Sonskyn Beperk	Marius du Plessis	Film	
2016	Cape Town	James Wallace	TV mini series	
2016	Twee Grade van Moord	Ben's doctor	Film	
2016	Hum	The Orwellian Mouth	Short film	
2016	Snaaks Genoeg	Hugo	Film	
2017	Vrekfontein	Valk Volschenk	Short film	
2018	Tuiskoms		Short film	
2018	Arendsvlei	Wilfred	TV series	
2019	Die Spreeus	Marthinus	TV series	
2019	Gebles	Dr. Benninghof	Short film	
2020	Home Affairs: A Christmas Tale		TV movie	
