= André Nascimento (footballer) =

Brazilian footballer (1982–2010)

Personal information
- Full name: André Francisco do Nascimento
- Date of birth: 10 April 1982
- Place of birth: Recife, Brazil
- Date of death: 12 November 2010 (aged 28)
- Place of death: Uberaba, Brazil
- Height: 1.87 m (6 ft 2 in)
- Position: Forward

Youth career
- Portuguesa
- Santo André

Senior career*
Years	Team	Apps	(Gls)
2006–2007	América Mineiro		
2008	Araxá		
2008–2009	Malmö FF		
2009–2010	Uberaba		
- * Club domestic league appearances and goals

André Francisco do Nascimento (10 April 1982 – 12 November 2010), better known as André Nascimento, was a Brazilian professional footballer who played as a forward.

== Career ==
A centre forward, André Nascimento played for Portuguesa, Santo André, América-MG, Araxá, Malmö FF and Uberaba, the club where he won the Taça Minas Gerais in 2009 and 2010, where he was the competition's top scorer.

== Death ==
André Nascimento was murdered on 12 November 2010 with two shots, in the city of Uberaba. The player's body was still dragged by car until people surrounded the vehicle. The perpetrator alleged that the player was involved in a love triangle with his wife.

The crime occurred during the semi-final matches of the 2010 Taça Minas Gerais, a competition that ended with his club, Uberaba, champion, and André being posthumously champion.

== Honours ==
Uberaba

- Taça Minas Gerais: 2009, 2010
