= André Sanglier =

French politician

André Sanglier (10 May 1911, Saint-Pierre, Réunion – 22 October 1997) was a French politician. He represented French Madagascar as a member of the Rally of Left Republicans (RGR) in the National Assembly from 1956 to 1959.
