= André Bardet =

French painter

André Bardet (9 January 1909 – 2006) was a French painter born in Clermont Ferrand, France.

== Background ==
Self-taught, Bardet first began painting at the age of 17. In his hometown of Coudes in Auvergne, Bardet was discovered by Victor Charreton, a notable Impressionist and a member of the School of Paris. Charreton began to serve as a mentor for the young Bardet, assisting him in developing his signature brushstroke. Bardet was not only influenced by Charreton, but by many other prominent Impressionists as well. The influence that Impressionism had upon Bardet is apparent in his painting.

== Career ==
Bardet had an eighty-year storied career as an international painter (1926-2006). His subjects ranged from city streets in France to waterfront views in the United States. Bardet is particularly recognized for his exceptional ability to portray light and movement in his various paintings. In 1987, Bardet was awarded the Silver Medal of "Academie Europeanne des Arts de France."

Subject Matter

Many of Bardet's paintings depict scenes in various cities of Normandy, Provence, Auvergne, and near Paris. In addition to this, Bardet painted several pieces outside of his native France. One of his prominent paintings, for example, features a view of the Navesink River in New Jersey from a cliff beside a dock. "The Navesink" is one of Bardet's most recognized paintings. In addition to France and the United States, Bardet painted and exhibited in Japan.

"When the light draws my eye and the subject grabs hold of me, that’s when I have to paint immediately.” - André Bardet

Throughout his career, Bardet captured the reflections, torments, and brilliance of water, the opalescence of the gray ocean, and the harsh blues of the Mediterranean Sea. He portrayed muted Parisian morning mist, clouds in Fécamp, Kersaint in Bretagne at low tide, and the Buron Castle looming over the plains of the Allier River. Bardet additionally brought to life animated streets with lively people at markets and cafés. These scenes are just some of many that Bardet painted throughout his life.

== Exhibitions ==
Bardet held many group and one-person exhibitions including: Club Pernod, Champs Elysees, Paris: 1985, 1986, 1987, 1988; Hotel Mercure, Clermont Ferrand: 1988; Town Hall of Levallois: September 1988; Caisse d’epargne, Clermont Ferrand: 1989.

Sales and Auctions

• Limoges, Aurillac, Clermont Ferrand: 1990

Shows/Fairs

• French Artist – Grand Palais, Paris

• Japanese Festival of Osaka from 1984 to 1989

• Panorama of Contemporary Painting, Berne, Switzerland

• European Academy of Arts, France – Silver Medal

Publications

• International Art Directory – SERMANDIRAS Editions 1986/87, 1988/89, 1990/91

• Classification of painters – AKOUN – 1991

• “ARGUS” Guide – 1990

• Le Semestriel des Arts; MINITEL 36 15 COTE DES ARTS
