= Andre Schickling =

German pool player

André Schickling
Personal information
- Nickname: Sharivari
- Born: 19 September 1989 (age 36) Germany
- Website: https://sharivari.net

Pool career
- Turned pro: 2021
- Pool games: 8-Ball, 9-Ball, 10-Ball

André Schickling or Sharivari is a German professional Pool player. He is currently playing for club Billiard Sportverein Dachau in the highest German league, Bundesliga Pool.

== Early life ==
Sharivari used to play pool at an early age with his father. However, he stopped playing pool actively and only resumed at the age of 23. He has been active since then.

== Career ==
Sharivari is professionally playing for Billiard Sportverein Dachau in Bundesliga Pool. Earlier, he has won several tournaments and matches in Germany. He is also known for his YouTube channel where he teaches how to play pool.

In 2020, Pools Power 15 named Sharivari as the 11th most influential person in the pool industry. A year later, he was named as the 9th most influential person. In March 2022 he was seen on the front cover of Billiards Digest.
