= Andre Campbell (physician) =

American physician

Andre R. Campbell
- Education: Harvard University; University of California, San Francisco
- Scientific career
- Workplaces: University of California, San Francisco

Andre R. Campbell is an American physician. He is a Professor of Surgery and the Vice Chair for Opportunity and Outreach at the University of California, San Francisco.

== Early life and education ==
Campbell is from Queens, New York. He grew up during the civil rights movement. At the age of 13, his science teacher encouraged him to become a physician. He studied biology at Harvard University and graduated in 1980. He was a medical student at the University of California, San Francisco, and completed his medical degree in 1985. He was a medical resident specialising in internal medicine at the Columbia University Vagelos College of Physicians. After completing his first residency, Campbell switched to surgery, where he was the only Black resident.

== Research and career ==
In 1994, Campbell joined the faculty at the University of California, San Francisco, and worked as a physician at the San Francisco General Hospital. His research considers the treatment of trauma patients in the intensive care unit.

In 2000, Campbell was a founding member of the Haile T. Debas Academy of Medical Educators. The academy has a focus on improving health through diversity, advocacy, and innovation. He was awarded the Association for Surgical Education Education Award in 2003. In 2003 he was made Endowed Chair of Surgical Education, a 5-year post that was renewed in 2009. In 2006, Campbell and SF General Trauma were profiled in the San Francisco Chronicle article General, Life and Death at San Francisco's Hospital of Last Resort / For Trauma Team, Saving Lives is Both a Social and Medical Mission. In 2011 Campbell was recognized by the San Francisco Board of Supervisors for his service as a trauma surgeon. Throughout his career he has advocated for social justice. On Earth Day in 2017 he was part of a 'teach in' that called for more medics to be involved with policy work. He encouraged the audience to “advocate for your patients, advocate for issues you're passionate about, and advocate for institutions you believe in,”.

He serves as the Vice Chair for Opportunity and Outreach in the UCSF Department of Surgery. He has been involved with various diversity initiatives across campus, including the White Coats for Black Lives movement that started in response to Black Lives Matter.

Campbell is an advocate for gun violence prevention. In the aftermath of the YouTube headquarters shooting, Campbell treated patients at the San Francisco General Hospital. He delivered the UCSF School of Medicine Last Lecture, an annual lecture where the speaker is selected by the student body.

In 2018, he was elected to the Board of Governors at the American College of Surgeons. He is president elect at the Columbia University Alumni John Jones Surgical Society.

In the early days of the COVID-19 pandemic, Campbell spoke about the need for social distancing, lockdowns, and sneezing into your elbow. In early March 2020, he said that his medical team at UCSF “has moved into disaster planning mode,”.

=== Awards and honours ===
2003 Association for Surgical Education Award

2010 University of California, San Francisco Martin Luther King, Jr. Award

2023 The city of San Francisco named Nov. 2, 2023 'Dr. Andre Campbell Day'

== Selected publications ==
- Holland, Martin C.; Mackersie, Robert C.; Morabito, Diane; Campbell, Andre R.; Kivett, Valerie A.; Patel, Rajiv; Erickson, Vanessa R.; Pittet, Jean-Francois (2003). "The Development of Acute Lung Injury Is Associated with Worse Neurologic Outcome in Patients with Severe Traumatic Brain Injury". The Journal of Trauma: Injury, Infection, and Critical Care. 55 (1): 106–111. doi:10.1097/01.ta.0000071620.27375.be. ISSN 0022-5282. PMID 12855888.
- Pierluissi, Edgar; Fischer, Melissa A.; Campbell, Andre R.; Landefeld, C. Seth (2003-12-03). "Discussion of Medical Errors in Morbidity and Mortality Conferences". JAMA. 290 (21): 2838–2842. doi:10.1001/jama.290.21.2838. ISSN 0098-7484. PMID 14657068.
- Eberhard, Laura W.; Morabito, Diane J.; Matthay, Michael A.; Mackersie, Robert C.; Campbell, Andre R.; Marks, James D.; Alonso, James A.; Pittet, Jean-François (2000). "Initial severity of metabolic acidosis predicts the development of acute lung injury in severely traumatized patients". Critical Care Medicine. 28 (1): 125–131. doi:10.1097/00003246-200001000-00021. ISSN 0090-3493. PMID 10667511. S2CID 1752931.
