= Andre Jordan =

British artist, writer and poet

Andre Jordan is a British artist, writer and poet. He is a regular columnist on the disability website produced by the BBC, "Ouch!", and contributes art to the garden blog, "A Way to Garden."

== Website ==
Jordan maintains the website, "www.abeautifulrevolution.com", a forum that showcases his verse and poetry, in addition to documenting his struggles with a major depressive disorder. As of 2010, the site has received over two million hits.

== Writing ==
Jordan has had two books published: Heaven Knows I'm Miserable Now and If You're Happy and You Know It.

== Design ==
Jordan has also stated that he designs cards and "stuff" on his personal website and in the "Shop" section of the website, Jordan sells textiles, lithographs and antique rugs, among other items.
