= André Dekeijser =

Belgian sculptor (1924–2013)

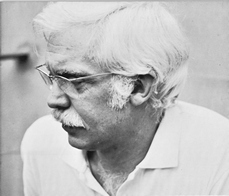
- André Dekeijser 1974
- Born: André Dekeijser; 1 August 1924; Brussels, Belgium
- Died: 9 December 2013; Brussels, Belgium
- Known for: sculpture

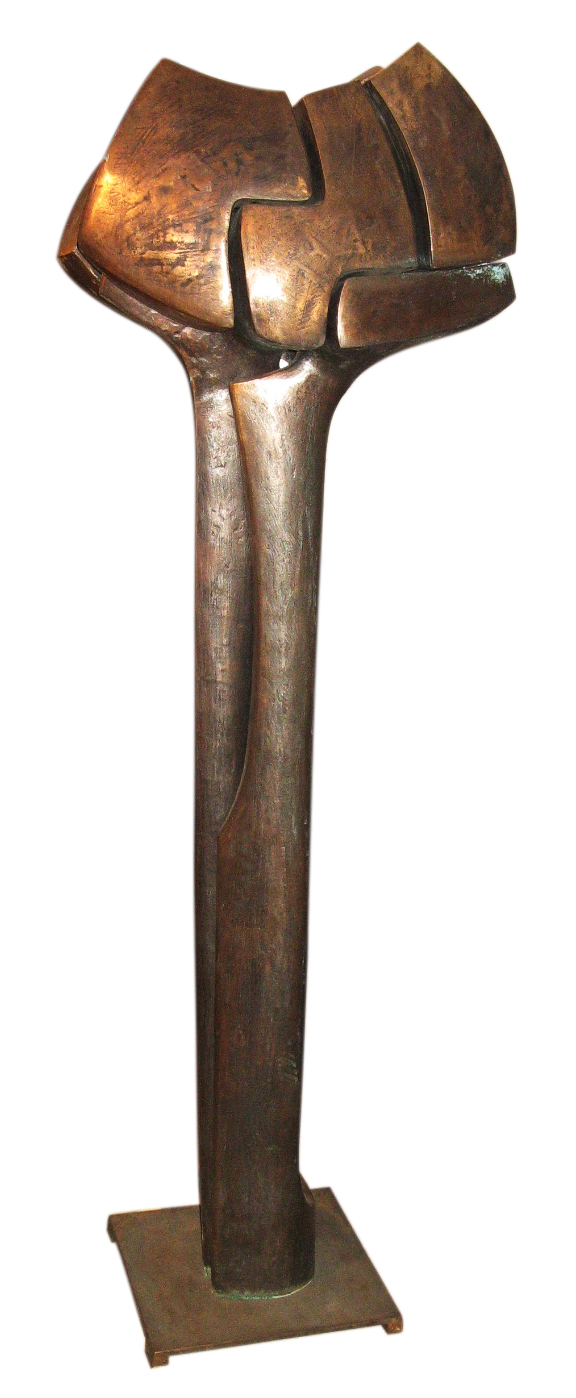
Large bronze, 1975

André Dekeijser (Brussel 1 August 1924 – 9 December 2013) was a Belgian contemporary sculptor known for his abstract and monumental work primarily in copper and bronze.

== Biography ==
André Dekeijser lived in Port-Francqui (Ilebo/Congo), from 1926 to 1929, before moving back to Belgium.

He quickly developed his artistic talent and studied graphic arts at the Academie Royale des Beaux-Arts de Bruxelles. After the Second World War, he worked for several years in the ceramics workshop of Alexandre Geufanstein before heading off in search of his (deceased) father's legacy in the Congo in 1952. There, he worked at the Geographical Institute of the Belgian Congo (I.G.C.B.). During this period, he created his first sculptures which were exhibited in Kinshasa in 1957. The influence of African art was already apparent in his work.

André Dekeijser started a family and returned to Belgium for 2 years where he worked as the cartographer of the provincial domain of Mirwart. Soon after he left with his wife and two children for an adventure in São Paulo, Brazil.

Upon his return 3 years later he decided to dedicate himself to sculpture. He joined his friend André Eijberg before establishing a workshop of his own where he returned to terracotta and patinas and began experimenting with new materials like blocks of Ytong (aerated concrete), whose low price allowed him to create oversized pieces. He also worked with wood and stone and began casting work in bronze, polishing some parts and creating patinas on others.

== Work ==
Having manipulated terracotta, wood, stone and Y'tong, André Dekeijser focused on copper and bronze. The polishing and application of patinas on bronze pieces increased their relief and rendered them tactile. His first monumental pieces were created in copper. He cut, soldered and applied patinas to red copper creating larger formats whose intertwining shapes evoke the notion of the couple. In order to ascertain pieces could withstand enlargement, small clay or wax models were submitted to a test of a series of figurines diminishing in size.

Having constructed several homes in the Congo and Brazil with his own hands, André Dekeijser created the project and built the model of a sculpture-home that was never completed despite the genuine interest of several architects. He also used his artistic talent to illustrate a textbook for students on the practice and techniques of Osteopathy. For his own pleasure he drew several comic strips with no intention of publishing. He also created bronze and silver jewelry using the lost-wax casting process.

== Styles and influences ==
Having lived far from modern civilization, in the large tropical forests of Central Africa and the immense high plateaus of southern Brazil, it's no wonder that his art is neither weak or timid, but rather massive. The forms are robust but gracious lacking aggressiveness despite sharp edges; influenced by African art. André Dekeijser admired the work of Constant Permeke, before turning to abstract art wherein he was profoundly inspired by Henry Moore. The empty spaces in his abstract work are as important as the relief.

In the early 1980s his study of forms took on a more sensual aspect. The duality of the sexes is present in this period. The duality of couples in shapes that interpenetrate, that embrace without touching that are nothing without the other is perhaps the subject most fully developed by the artist. Other themes explored include the mechanics of objects that make up a puzzle whereby the fun lies in studying the empty spaces and surfaces of each piece by taking them apart and trying to put them back in the correct order. These pieces require the spectator to touch and play with the objects in addition to looking at them. During this mechanical period, André Dekeijser created numerous drawings for astonishing machines that inevitably solicited the question : " what could they possibly be used for? »

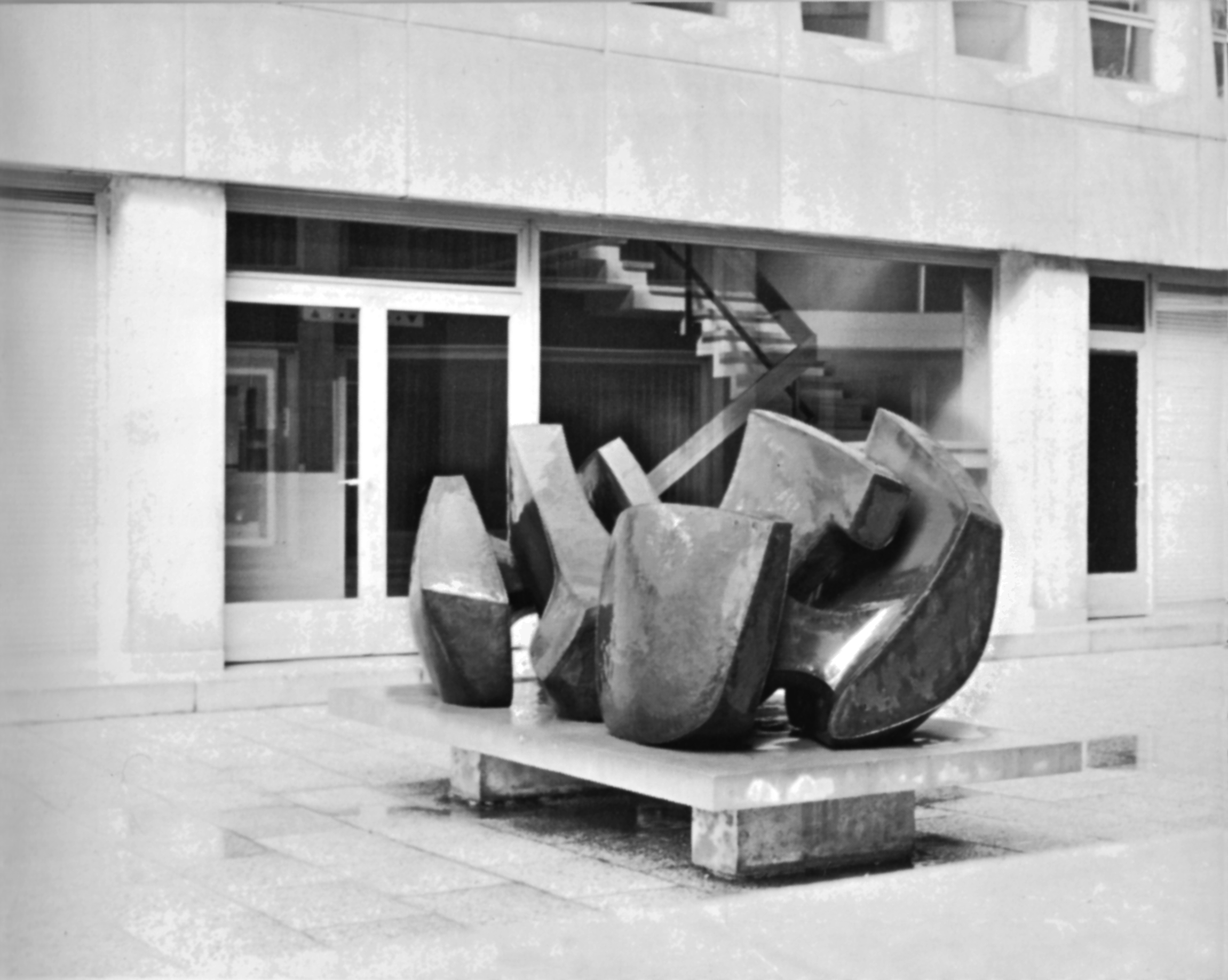
Giant Laying Forms 1971, Arlon-Triers

== Realisations ==
- 1957 : First exhibition in Kinshasa
- 1966 : Gallery Egmont at the Petit Sablon
- 1969 : Galerie "Le rempart"
- 1971 : Galerie "Arcanes" and " Centre du Bâtiment" in Brussels.
- 1971 : A large copper piece " Grandes formes couchées nr. 2 " installed between the rue d'Arlon and the rue de Trève.
- 1972 : Acquisition of a piece for the hanging gardens of the Manhattan Center (Brussels)
- Works acquired by the Belgian government as well as Belgian and foreign private collections
- 1972 : Sculpture in the city : [Exhibition]
- 1975 : Open-air sculptures : Contemporary Belgian sculptors: [Exhibition]
- 1980 : The commune of Watermael-Boitsfort acquired "Formes dans l'espace nr. 10"
- 1982 : The commune of Watermael-Boitsfort acquires "Formes dans l'espace nr. 5" a large bronze exposed dans in the hall of "La maison de la culture" of Boitsfort.
- 1984 : Exhibition at "La Vénerie", Culturel center of Watermael-Boitsfort, 15.11 1984 – 02.12 1984
- 1990 : Participant, 6 PHOTOGRAPHERS AND 6 SCULPTORS A LA VENERIE
- 2016 : “COUPLES” Retrospective 1958 – 1986 Sculptures 19 November 2015 to 9 January 2016

== Notes and references ==
- MONUMENTS, sculptures in the urban fabric Kortrijk October 2011, ISBN 9789461360182, p. 90/91
- Illustrated Biographical Dictionary of Artists in Belgium since 1830 ed. Arto 1995
- Osteopathy, vertebral joint diagnosis diagnostic articulaire vertébral Author(s) : Jean-Pierre Barral, Jean-Paul Mathieu, Pierre Mercier, André Dekeijser Publisher : Diffusion Maloine 1982
