= José de Avelar Rebelo =

Portuguese painter

- Died: 1657 (aged 56–57)
- Occupation: Painter

José de Avelar Rebelo (c.1600–1657) was a Portuguese painter of about the middle of the 17th century. He was appointed Royal Painter to the King Dom João IV of Portugal.
