= Karla Avelar =

Salvadoran human rights activist

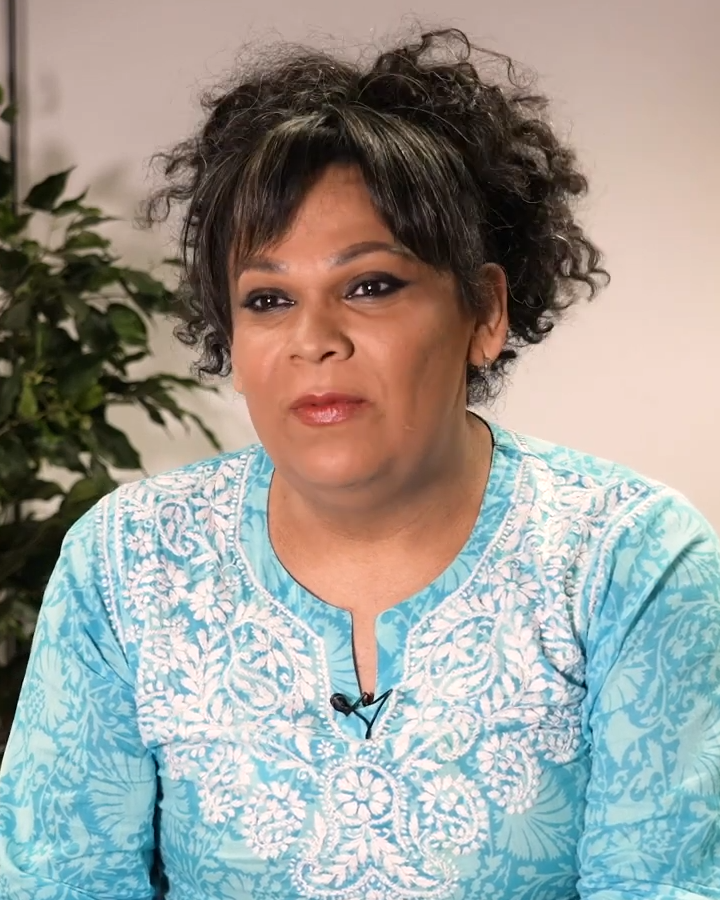
- Born: 7 January 1978

Karla Avelar is a Salvadoran transgender rights activist was born in 1978 in El Salvador. Karla Avelar is the executive director and founder of Comcavis Trans an NGO dedicated to combatting discrimination against trans women living with HIV in El Salvador. COMCAVIS Trans also advocates against discrimination of transgender individuals and anti-trans sentiment in various sectors of Salvadoran society. Speaking about violence against transgender people in Salvadoran society, Avelar states, "Now they are after your life. Now it's more of a silent society, one that today won't humiliate you, but kills you." As such, Karla Avelar has dedicated themselves to multiple organizations, such as El Nombre De la Rosa (The name of the Rose) including Aspidh Arcoiris Trans since the 1990s. Now, she works directly with COMCAVIS Trans.

Under Avelar's leadership, the COMCAVIS organization has kept and continues to keep records of violations and cases of homicide against LGBT individuals living in El Salvador for the past 15 years. COMCAVIS Trans records reveal that after homicide cases occur, Salvadoran authorities cannot provide reparations, protection, or guarantee that homicides will not occur again for LGBT communities. For example, in October 2016 a transgender man beat by police and over 73 percent of authorities in Salvadoran society view homosexuality as a "mental disease." COMCAVIS Trans, therefore, has serves the transgender community through legal assistance and a care shelter.

Currently, Karla Avelar resides in Switzerland after being extended asylum for receiving extortion and death threats from maras (gangs) in El Salvador. Karla Avelar continues to work with COMCAVIS Trans by serving as a delegate for the UN in Geneva, advises the International Platform against Impunity, and is a member of the Asile LGBT organization.

== Biography ==
Karla Avelar was born in the Chalatenango Department a region of El Salvador that was the extremely impacted by the Civil War alongside the Morazán Department. Avelar was raised by a Catholic family and experienced sexual abuse within her family. At the age of nine, Karla Avelar experienced sexual assault by a cousin, specifically a form of "corrective rape" which drove her to flee from her home after the second time she was raped. More specifically, corrective rape is constituted as a hate crime. Perpetrators perpetuate corrective rape against individuals who do not conform to society's norms of sexuality or gender in order to "correct" their sexual orientation as a product of homophobia and misogyny. For this reason, Karla Avelar was not able to finish primary school. Moreover, Karla Avelar fled to San Salvador where she lived unhoused and entered the sex work industry and she continued to experience further experiences of sexual assault due being much younger than older sex workers. In San Salvador, Avelar was taken into a woman's home to do domestic chores. But, she was raped by the woman's son alongside 13 MS-13 members after going out to buy tortillas in a business that was located on MS territory. Eventually, a transgender woman named, Diana gave her a place to stay until she was murdered by her partner. Sex work is the only option for many transgender women to earn a living in El Salvador.

In San Salvador, she experienced and encountered sexual violence at the hands of maras known as gangs in El Salvador because she refused to undergo extortion. Karla Avelar was targeted by a serial killer who killed transgender individuals named La Matalocas (Trannykiller). This was the first assassination attempt to her life was in 1992, when she was just a teen, she was able to disarm her assailant who drew a .45 at Avelar. She ended up in the hospital shortly after and was diagnosed with HIV. She has received several death threats, and survived assassination attempts. Avelar was incarcerated for four years in El Salvador from 1996 to 2000 in Sector 2 in Sensuntepeque. Although Avelar acted in self-defense, the claims of transgender people in El Salvador are not seen as valid or taken seriously by Salvadoran authorities. During the first day of her incarceration, Avelar was raped 100 times by gang members and Salvadoran authorities from the penitentiary. According to Avelar, Salvadoran authorities recognized that the abuse and torture continued to occur regularly, but did not intervene. For this reason, the experience marked her and was the hardest period of her life to endure.

Upon being released from jail, Karla Avelar established a formal complaint against the prison. She also held a press conference against the serial killer and was one of the first survivors to denounce and identify him against authorities. She continued to work and stay in communication with transgender and gay individuals who were incarcerated in order to protect them from abuse or harassment from gang members and authorities. Karla Avelar founded COMCAVIS Trans in 2008 with a group of transgender activists. Avelar was forced to leave El Salvador because after winning the Martin Ennals Award for Human Rights Defenders she was under the threat of extortion for the award amount by local gangs. she did not believe she would survive a fourth assassination attempt and filed for asylum.

== Organizing and advocacy work ==
In 2008, Avelar founded the support organization for transgender people called Comcavis Trans, it was founded as a response to the needs of trans women participating in the various support groups, such as HIV Prevention who were unable to obtain information to combat stigmas in El Salvador's society. In recent years, Karla Avelar has utilized her platform to help transgender individuals from El Salvador apply for asylum, specifically in the United States. Immigration policies in the U.S. aim to control citizenship and reinforce definitions of who belongs to the nation-state. According to Guadalupe Marquez-Velarde et al., many transgender migrants from Latin America migrate to the U.S. or begin the asylee process because of a perceived level of safety in the U.S. and "greater acceptance" of transgender identity in contrast to El Salvador. Historically, individuals from Central America have not been extended or granted refugee status due to the geopolitical and historical forces shaping policies of exclusion against Central American refugee seekers.

Karla Avelar is known as one of the first trans women in 2013 to denounce and present themselves against the Salvadoran government at the Inter-American Commission on Human Rights for discrimination and hate crimes against LGBT individuals.

== Recognition and awards ==
She was a finalist of the Martin Ennals Award for Human Rights Defenders in the year of 2017.
