= Avella (disambiguation) =

Avella is a town in Italy.

Avella may also refer to:

- Avella, Pennsylvania, a village in southwestern Pennsylvania
- Kia Avella, an automobile
- Avella, a synonym of the spider genus Menneus
- Giovanni d’Avella, author of Regole di musica, divise in cinque trattati (Rome, 1657)
