= André Schmidt =

German footballer

Personal information
- Date of birth: 1 February 1989 (age 37)
- Place of birth: Zeulenroda, Germany
- Height: 1.82 m (6 ft 0 in)
- Position: Defender

Youth career
- –2002: FSV Schleiz
- 2002–2008: Carl Zeiss Jena

Senior career*
Years	Team	Apps	(Gls)
2007–2015	Carl Zeiss Jena	12	(0)
2007–2019	Carl Zeiss Jena II	199	(23)
Total		211	(23)
- * Club domestic league appearances and goals

André Schmidt (born 1 February 1989 in Zeulenroda) is a German former professional footballer who played as a defender.
