= André Trepoll =

German politician (born 1977)

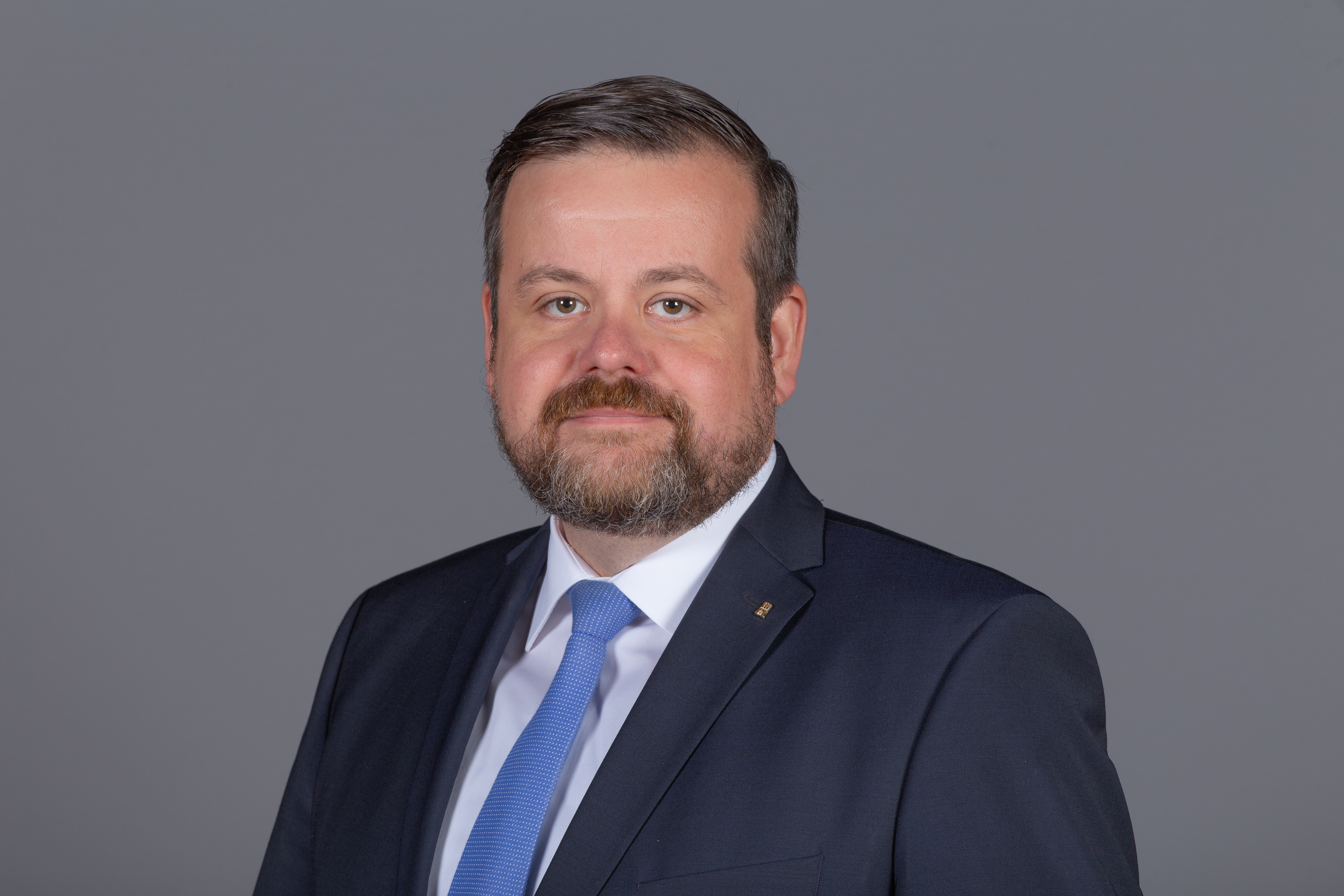
- Trepoll in 2018

Member of the Hamburg Parliament
- Incumbent
- Assumed office 17 March 2004

Personal details
- Born: 28 July 1977 (age 48) Celle
- Party: Christian Democratic Union (since 1993)

André Trepoll (born 28 July 1977 in Celle) is a German politician serving as a member of the Hamburg Parliament since 2004. He has served as vice president of the parliament since 2020.
