= André F. J. Scott =

Canadian lawyer

André F.J. Scott is a Canadian lawyer who served as a justice with the Federal Court of Appeal. He has previously served as Chief of staff of the Minister of National Defence and of the Minister of Communications.

== Biography ==
Scott was born in Ottawa, Ontario. After completing public high school, he studied at the University of Ottawa, where he received a BA degree in 1972, an LL.L degree in 1975, and an LL.M degree (in Business Law) in 1980.

Scott was called to the Bar of Québec in 1976, and entered private law practice at the firm of Taché and Pharand, in Hull, Quebec that same year. He remained with T&P until 1980, when he became legal counsel and corporate secretary to the AECL. In 1983 he became the secretary general and executive assistant to the Chairman of the Atomic Energy Board, where he remained through 1986. In 1987 Scott was named special advisor to the Minister of Energy, Mines, and Resources; in 1989 he became chief of staff to the Minister of Communications, where he remained through 1990. In 1991 he became chief of staff to the Minister of National Defense; In 1992 he became chief of staff to the Minister of Consumer and Corporate Affairs. In 1993 he was named assistant secretary of the Secretariat of Canadian Intergovernmental Affairs for the Province of Quebec (Assistant Deputy Minister); in 1995 he became vice-chair and vice-president of Legal Services of the Agricultural and Food Marketing Board of Quebec. He left that position in 1999 to become vice-president of Corporate Affairs, Corporate Secretary and General Counsel, Polycor Inc., remaining there through 2008, when he was appointed chair of the Canadian International Trade Tribunal (2008–2010). He was named a judicial member of the Competition Tribunal in 2011, and a member of the Board of Directors of the Council of Canadian Administrative Tribunals.

Scott was appointed Judge of the Federal Court in October 2010, Judge of the Court Martial Appeal Court in May 2012; Judge of the Federal Court of Appeal in January 2014.
