= André Krzatala =

German footballer

Personal information
- Full name: André-Waclaw Krzatala
- Date of birth: 16 January 1990 (age 36)
- Place of birth: West Germany
- Height: 1.86 m (6 ft 1 in)
- Position: Forward

Youth career
- –2006: Frisch Auf Wybelsum
- 2006–2009: Kickers Emden

Senior career*
Years	Team	Apps	(Gls)
2008–2009	Kickers Emden	1	(0)
- * Club domestic league appearances and goals

André-Waclaw Krzatala (born 16 January 1990) is a German footballer who plays as a forward.

== Career ==
While at Sportfreunde Larrelt Krzatala sustained a knee injury and in September 2025 broke his foot.
