= André Sentenac =

French molecular biologist

Georges André Sentenac
- Born: 4 May 1939 (age 87); France
- Known for: Study of RNA polymerase III transcription machinery, gene regulation in yeast
- Spouse: Pierrette Balse
- Children: Anne, Marion, Daniel
- Awards: Maurice Nicloux Prize, French Society of Biochemistry (1969); Paul Doisteau-Emile Blutel Prize, Academy of Sciences (1977); CNRS Silver Medal (1987); Charles-Léopold Mayer Grand Prize, French Academy of Sciences (1997); Member of EMBO (1985); Correspondent, French Academy of Sciences (1999); Member, French Academy of Sciences (2007)
- Scientific career
- Fields: Molecular biology, Gene transcription
- Workplaces: University of Orsay, Institut Pasteur, CNRS

Georges André Sentenac (born 4 May 1939) is a French molecular biologist specializing in gene transcription.

Married to Pierrette Balse, professor of mathematics at the University of Orsay, they had three children, all scientists, Anne, Marion and Daniel.

== Biography ==
He was elected correspondent of the French Academy of sciences in 1999 and then a member of the Institute in 2007.

== Scientific career ==
During his postdoctoral internship in Dr. George Acs' laboratory in New York City, Sentenac addresses the regulation of gene expression by showing that appropriate hormonal treatment forces a young male cockerel to produce certain specific components of the egg. Back in France, to bypass the complexity of higher organisms, he chose to work on the yeast Saccharomyces cerevisiae. In the following years, this yeast will become an essential study model in the molecular genetics of eukaryotic cells.

First, he isolated and identified the essential components of the molecular machinery responsible for gene transcription in yeast. He gave the first complete description of the three forms of nuclear RNA polymerases which are composed of the assembly of many subunits with various functions. Focusing his efforts on the transcription of the large family of class III genes encoding tRNAs, 5S RNA and other small RNAs, he isolated the general transcription factors TFIIIC and TFIIIB and described the cascade of protein-DNA and protein-protein interaction leading to the recruitment of RNA polymerase III on DNA and the initiation of transcription. A total of 26 proteins are dedicated to the transcription of class III genes. In particular, it shows that the TFIIIC factor consists of two protein modules capable of binding to two distinct promoter elements spaced differently according to genes, of lifting chromatin repression and of recruiting TFIIIB.

== Awards and honours ==
- 1969, Maurice Nicloux Prize of the French Society of Biochemistry
- 1977, Paul Doisteau-Emile Blutel Prize from the Academy of Sciences
- 1985, Elected Member of EMBO
- 1987, CNRS Silver Medal
- 1997, Charles-Léopold Mayer Grand Prize of the French Academy of sciences
- 1999, Member of the Academia Europaea
- 1999, Correspondent of the French Academy of sciences
- 1999-2004, Member of the EMBO Council
- 2007, Member of the French Academy of sciences
- 2012, Commander in the Ordre des Palmes Académiques
- 2018, Officer in the Ordre de la Légion d'Honneur

== More representative publications ==
- Sentenac, A. Eukaryotic RNA polymerases. CRC Crit. Rev. Biochem. (1985) 18: 31-90
- Marzouki, N., CaMier, S., Ruet, A, Moenne, A, and Sentenac, A. Selective proteolysis defines two DNA binding domains in yeast transcription factor τ. Nature (1986) 323: 176-178
- Margottin, F., Dujardin, G., Gérard, M., Égly, J.-M., Huet, J. and Sentenac, A. Participation of the TATA factor in transcription of the yeast U6 gene by RNA polymerase C. Science (1991) 251: 424-426
- Burnol, A-F., Margottin, F., Huet, J., Almouzni, G., Prioleau, M.-N., Méchali, M., and Sentenac, A. TFIIIC relieves repression of U6 snRNA transcription by chromatin. Nature (1993) 62: 475-477
- Marsolier, M.-C., Tanaka, S., Livingstone-Zatchej, M., Grunstein, M., Thoma, F. and Sentenac, A. Reciprocal interferences between nucleosomal organization and transcriptional activity of the yeast SNR6 gene. Genes & Dev. (1995) 9: 410-422
- Rüth, J., Conesa, C., Dieci, G., Lefebvre, O., Düsterhöft, A, Ottonello, S., and Sentenac, A. A suppressor of mutations in the class III transcription system encodes a component of yeast TFIIIB. EMBO J. (1996) 15: 1941-1949
- Dieci, G. and Sentenac, A. Facilitated recycling pathway for RNA polymerase III. Cell (1996) 84: 245-252
- Chédin, S., Ferri, M.L., Peyroche, G., Andrau, J.C., Jourdain, S., Lefebvre, O., Werner, M., CarLes, C., and Sentenac, A. The yeast RNA polymerase III transcription machinery: a paradigm for eukaryotic gene activation. Cold Spring Harb. Symp. Quant. Biol. (1998) 63: 381-389
- Oficjalska-Pham, D., Harismendy, O., Smagowicz, W.J., Gonzalez de Peredo, A, Boguta, M., Sentenac, A. and Lefebvre, O. General repression of RNA polymerase III transcription is triggered by protein phosphatase type 2A-mediated dephosphorylation of Maf1 Mol. Cell (2006) 22: 623-632.
- Ducrot, C., Lefebvre, O., Landrieux, E., Guirouilh-Barbat, J., Sentenac, A. and Acker, J. Reconstitution of the yeast RNA polymerase III transcription system with all recombinant factors. J. Biol. Chem. (2006) 281: 11685-11692
- Sentenac, A. and Riva, M. Odd RNA polymerases or the A(B)C of eukaryotic transcription. Biochim. Biophys. Acta (2013) 1829 : 251-257

== Main books ==
- Sentenac, A. and Hall, B. Yeast RNA polymerases and their role in transcription in The Molecular Biology of the Yeast Saccharomyces. Cold Spring Harbor Laboratory Press (1982) pp 561–606
- Thuriaux, P. and Sentenac, A.Yeast nuclear RNA Polymerases in The Molecular and Cellular Biology of the Yeast Saccharomyces : Gene expression. Cold Spring Harbor Laboratory Press (1991) pp 1–48
