= André Wlodarczyk =

Polish-French linguist

Prof. Dr André Wlodarczyk
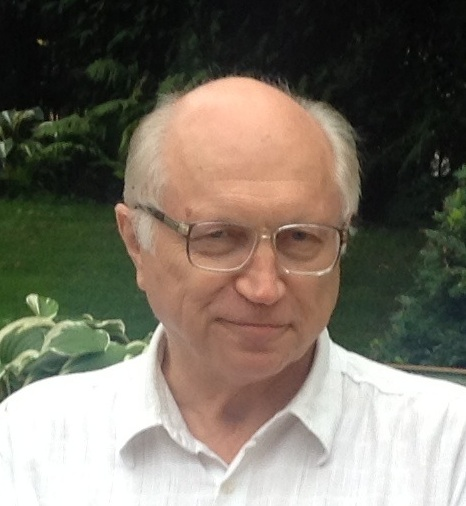
- Born: 25 November 1944 (age 81); Gnatowice, Poland
- Education: Paris Diderot University
- Spouse(s): Hélène Wlodarczyk; Prof. dr hab. Université Paris 4 (Paris-Sorbonne)
- Website: Personal Page

Andrzej Aleksander Włodarczyk (born November 25, 1944, in Poland), known as André Wlodarczyk, is a Polish-French linguist.

== Biography ==
André Wlodarczyk lived in Wroclaw, Teresin and Warsaw. In 1969, he settled in Paris. He has dual Polish-French citizenship.

He studied (1) Japanese Philology at Institut national des langues et civilisations orientales (INALCO) and at Université Denis Diderot - Paris 7 and (2) General Linguistics at Université René Descartes - Paris 5. These studies were crowned with a doctorate (doctorat de 3e cycle ) in 1977 and habilitation (doctorat d'État) in 1987 at the Japanese Language and Culture department of Université Denis Diderot (Paris 7).

From 1979 to 1992, Wlodarczyk worked as a researcher at the Centre National de la Recherche Scientifique – CNRS, and later as a professor at the following universities: Stendhal - Grenoble 3 (1992–2000) and Charles de Gaulle - Lille 3 (2000–2011). Moreover, in the years from 2000 to 2011, he supervised research in linguistics at CELTA (Centre for Theoretical and Applied Linguistics), Université Paris-Sorbonne (Paris 4).

== Scientific activities ==
=== Structure of the Japanese language ===
Wlodarczyk has edited seven volumes of Travaux de Linguistique Japonaise (L'Asiathèque) and a special issue of the quarterly "Langages" (Larousse, 1982) devoted to Japanese linguistics. Research themes:

- grammatical oppositions: morphological structure of the Japanese conjugation
- base components of utterances (Major Phrases)
- Meta-informative Centering (alternative theory of 'Information Structure')
- Japanese grammatical forms of politeness and the category of person.

=== Metainformation in language ===
He is the author of a new linguistic theory disseminated under the acronym MIC (Meta-Informative Centering theory [6]). This theory has been proposed as a result of the generalization of research on the structure of Japanese utterances. Simultaneously – as an extension of the MIC theory - the foundations for a new theory of situation semantics (AS - Associative Semantics) for the description of natural languages have been laid as an original combination of semantics with pragmatics within the framework of general linguistics.

=== Distributed Grammar ===
In cooperation with Hélène Wlodarczyk, the MIC theory was expanded and disseminated under the name of the Distributed Grammar Program (DG), bringing together in a coherent framework the problems of both linguistic predication and the theory of utterances known as the theory of "information structure" (Information Structure). Combining the MIC theory with the theory of "Associative Semantics" (AS), A. Wlodarczyk & H. Wlodarczyk created a unified theory of the meaning of an utterance as a plexus of different types of information (such as meta-information, ortho-information and para-information), including issues known as "Argument Structure".

=== Interactive Linguistics ===
Methodological studies [7] relate to the modeling of various phenomena using concepts and tools, and above all, to an interactive process consisting of four cyclical stages: abstraction, formalization, simplification and verification in the context of computer science. Interactive Linguistics is a research method involving the use of computer tools belonging to the field of Knowledge Discovery in Databases (KDD). A. Wlodarczyk is a co-author (with Georges Sauvet) of the computer platform SEMANA which brings together dozens of algorithms for symbolic and statistical computations.

=== Semiology of Prehistoric Rock Art ===
Using computer analysis techniques for automatic data and knowledge retrieval (knowledge discovery in databases - KDD) Georges Sauvet and Wlodarczyk have proved the existence of concept systems (beliefs) in the artworks of prehistoric man. This tradition continued without significant changes until the end of the Ice Age, i.e. for more than 20.000 years, despite important changes in the tools (worked flint, bone and antler).

== Publications ==
- Politesse et Personne – le japonais face aux langues occidentales, préface de Claude Hagège, Paris: Éditions L’Harmattan, Paris 1996.
- Revue trimestrielle „Langages”, Éditions Larousse, 1982, nr 68:.
- Paris Lectures in Japanese Linguistics, Tokyo: Éditions Kurosio, 2005.
- La Focalisation dans les langues, seria Sémantiques, eds. André & Hélène Wlodarczyk, Paris: L’Harmattan, Paris, 2006.
- Japanese Linguistics – European Chapter, eds. Viktoria Eschbach-Szabo, Yoshihiko Ikegami & André Wlodarczyk, Tokyo: Éditions Kurosio, 2007.
- Meta-informative Centering in Utterances – (Between Semantics and Pragmatics), eds. André Włodarczyk & Hélène Włodarczyk, John Benjamins Publishing Co., 2013.

=== Journals ===
- Travaux de linguistique japonaise, Paris: Université de Diderot (Paris 7), 1977-1997 – 7 tomów (4-10):
  - 1977, IV, Recherches en syntaxe
  - 1978, V, Phonologie du japonais standard
  - 1982, VI, Syntaxe et sémantique Dialectologie
  - 1984, VII, Énonciation et sens – Etudes contrastives – Linguistique et poétique
  - 1986, VIII, Actes du 4e colloque d’études japonaises
  - 1991, IX, Description systématique de la grammaire Japonaise – Grammaire de Mizutani Shizuo
  - 1997, X, Langue – Ordinateur – Mentalité (réd. Toshio Ishiwata & ANdré Włodarczyk)

=== References ===
- WLODARCZYK André, 1980,「主題から主語へ、そして主語から主題へ」、 言語 、Vol. 9, No 8/80 、大修館
- – 1982, Entre le thème et le sujet - 'wa' et 'ga', Travaux de linguistique japonaise, Vol. VI, Université de Paris VII, Paris.
- — 2003a, Les Homotopies du topique et du focus, Ordre et distinction dans la langue et le discours, Actes du colloque international de Metz (1999, publiés par Combettes B., Schnedecker C. & Theissen A., Honoré Champion Éditeur, Paris, p. 513-526.
- – 2003b, Les Cadres des situations sémantiques, Études Cognitives – Studia Kognitywne 5, Warszawa 2003, p. 35–51).
- – 2005, From Japanese to General Linguistics - starting with the ‘wa’ and ‘ga’ particles, Paris Lectures on Japanese Linguistics, ed. by Wlodarczyk André, Kurosio Shuppan, Tokyo
- – 2008 Roles and Anchors of Semantic Situations, Études cognitives / Studia kognitywne 8, SOW, PAN, Warsaw
- WŁODARCZYK André & WŁODARCZYK Hélène, 2006a, Focus in the Meta-informative Centering Theory, La Focalisation dans les langues, eds André Wlodarczyk & Hélène Wlodarczyk, L’Harmattan, Paris.
- — 2006b, Subject in the Meta-informative Centering Theory, Etudes cognitives / Studia kognitywne VII, SOW, PAN, Warszawa.
- — 2008, Roles, Anchors and Other Things we Talk About: Associative Semantics and Meta-Informative Centering Theory, Intercultural Pragmatics, Vol. 5. No. 3., Berlin/New York: Mouton de Gruyters.
- – 2013, Meta-informative Centering in Utterances – (Between Semantics and Pragmatics) Meta-informative Centering in Utterances – (Between Semantics and Pragmatics), eds. André Włodarczyk & Hélène Włodarczyk, John Benjamins Publishing Co., 2013.
- WLODARCZYK André & STACEWICZ Paweł 2010 Modeling in the Context of Computer Science - a Methodological Approach, Journal Studies in Logic, Grammar and Rhetoric, "Philosophical Trends in the 17th Century from the Modern Perspective", ed. by Halina Święczkowska, vol. 20 (33), 2010, a print and electronic journal
