= Andre Kaup =

German electrical engineer

Andre Kaup is an electrical engineer at the University of Erlangen-Nuremberg in Erlangen, Bavaria. He was named a Fellow of the Institute of Electrical and Electronics Engineers (IEEE) in 2013 for his contributions to video coding and object-based video signal processing.
