= André Zaoui =

French physicist

André Zaoui is a French physicist in material mechanics, born on 8 June 1941. He is a corresponding member of the French Academy of sciences and a member of the French Academy of Technologies.

== Biography ==
Civil Engineer at the École des Mines de Paris (1963), Master of Science in Physics and Mathematics at the Faculty of Sciences in Paris (1965), Doctor of State in Physics at the Faculty of Sciences in Paris (1970), he was a CNRS researcher at the École Polytechnique (1964–1972), Professor of Mechanics at the University of Paris-XIII (1972–1989), Research Director at the CNRS at the École Polytechnique (1990–2006) then at ENSAM Paris (2007–2009) and Professor of Mechanics at the École Polytechnique (1990–2004). He has also taught in other higher education establishments (Pierre-et-Marie-Curie University, École des mines de Paris, École nationale des ponts et chaussées, École nationale supérieure de techniques avancées, École centrale Paris).

== Scientific work ==
Zaoui's scientific work covers the fields of research, training and collective research animation. They are focused on the transition from microscopic to macroscopic material mechanics, at the crossroads between the mechanics of continuous media and materials science.

His research work has been devoted to investigating the relationships between the microstructure of mesoscale materials (scale of polycrystal grains, inclusions or fibres in composites, phase domains in multiphase materials...) and their macroscopic mechanical behaviour, both in deformation and damage. In this framework, his contributions focus on the design, development and use of theoretical, methodological and experimental tools to link the microscopic and macroscopic scales in materials mechanics.

He first (1964–72) studied the viscoplasticity of metals, in particular updating and interpreting the phenomenon of "creep hesitation ": to this end, he contributed to the development of models of the transition from single to polycrystal in elasto(visco)plasticity by proposing a critique of previous models and a secant formulation of the self-coherent model for non-linear behaviours.

He then (1972–90) developed a mechanistic approach to crystal plasticity: characterization and representation of latent strain-hardening for different classes of single crystals, prediction of its role in the strain-hardening of polycrystals, the formation of crystallographic textures and the initiation of plastic instabilities in large deformations (shear bands...); analysis of the mechanical influence of grain boundaries, triple junctions and intergranular sliding on the plasticity of multicrystals and polycrystals.

Since 1990, he has made various contributions to the micromechanics of heterogeneous and composite materials :

- taking into account the morphology and spatial distribution of phases according to a "representative morphological patterns" approach and establishing on this basis new frameworks and new estimates for the overall elasticity behaviour; modelling size and stacking effects in particulate composites; extension to hereditary and non-linear behaviours;

- proposal of the "affine formulation " for non-linear homogenization of hereditary and non-hereditary behaviours and comparative evaluation of different linearization methods;

- analysis of local fields by experimental characterization and mesoscale numerical simulation ("numerical mesoscope " ) and proposal of a methodology for the identification of intracrystalline behaviours based on the study of the local response of polycrystals.

This research activity was accompanied by training activity at several levels in the same scientific field: setting up and direction (1973-1980) of a university training course for materials engineers, recognised by the Commission des Titres d'Ingénieur; setting up and direction (1985–93) of the DEA "Mechanics and Materials " bringing together a university and five grandes écoles in the Ile-de-France region; setting up and direction (1991-2001) of the Major in Mechanics and then a master's degree in technological innovation (2001-2004) at the École polytechnique.

Research and training have been extended to include the conduct of collective research: direction or co-direction of laboratories (CNRS Laboratory of Mechanical Properties and Thermodynamics of Materials at the University of Paris-XIII from 1981 to 1989, Solid Mechanics Laboratory at the École Polytechnique from 1991 to 2000); creation and direction of federative research structures (FIRTECH Île-de-France Mechanics and Materials Pole from 1985 to 1993, Île-de-France Federation of Mechanics (materials, structures and processes), CNRS, from 2003 to 2008); national research activities (management of the Pôle national de recherche technologique en mécanique et matériaux from 1991 to 1995, CNRS mission leader from 1983 to 1989) and participation in national bodies responsible for research forecasting and orientation in various fields (materials, supersonics, aeronautics and space, nuclear materials ); organisation and chairmanship of international symposia, schools and congresses EUROMECH 183 symposium in 1984, advanced course at CISM in 1985, IUTAM symposium in 1995, etc.); participation in reading committees (Int. J. Plasticity, J.M.T.A, Eur. J. Mech. A/Solids, C.R. Mécanique), boards of directors and scientific councils (ENPC, École centrale Paris, ENS Cachan, ENSMA, EDF, Arcelor, CEA-DAM) and evaluation bodies (National Evaluation Commission, National Committee for Scientific Research, National Council of Universities, National Agency for the Evaluation of Scientific Research, National Council for Universities, etc.).

== Honours and awards ==
He has been a corresponding member of the French Academy of Sciences since 1990, a founding member of the French Academy of Technologies since 2000, a foreign associate member of the Hassan-II Academy of Science and Technology since 2006, Grand Medal of the SF2M (2002), laureate of the French Academy of sciences (Prix Trémont, 1982), CNRS bronze medal (1971).

He is Chevalier of the Ordre National de la Légion d'honneur (2003).
