= André do Avelar =

Author and professor

André do Avelar, also known as "Andre dauellar" (c. 1546, Lisbon), was a writer and professor who published astronomical works at the University of Coimbra. His works sought to explain astronomy, astrology, and the calendar year to the people of Lisbon. Despite his esteem, he would later be sentenced to life in prison by the Inquisition as he was accused of being a Judaizer.

== Personal life ==
André do Avelar was born in Lisbon, Portugal, in 1546. His mother, Violante Fernandes, and father, Galás do Avelar, were said to be New Christians from a poor background. They had seven other children: four sons and three daughters.

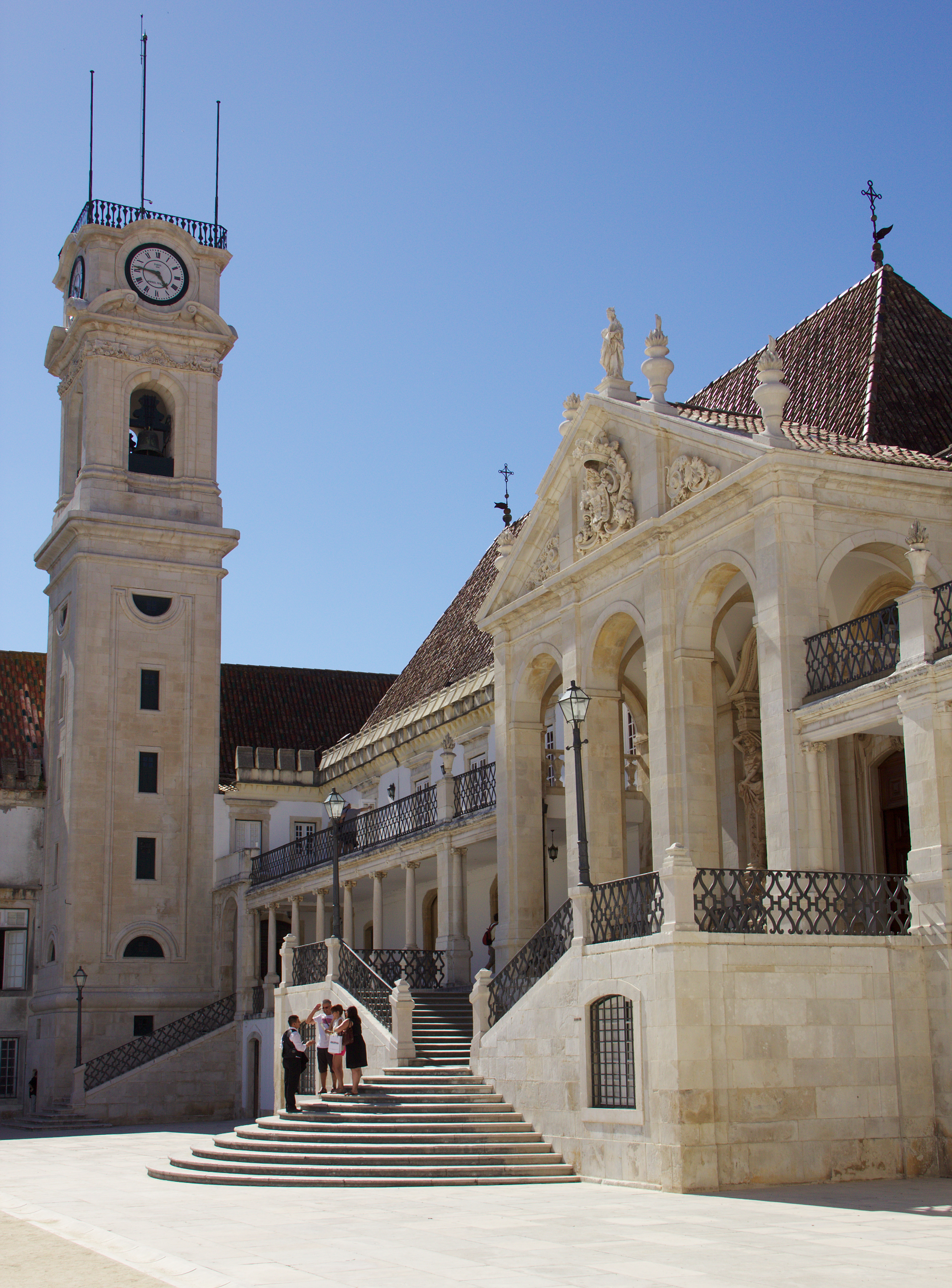
André do Avelar was a mathematics professor at The University of Coimbra for 24 years.

There is limited information about the early life of Avelar, including his work before arriving at the University of Coimbra. It is believed that he was educated later at Salamanca and Valladolid, receiving a Master of Arts degree. He also studied theology during this time. Avelar became an official mathematics professor at the University of Coimbra in 1592 at 45 years old. At Coimbra, he continued to teach and to publish works that outlined the composition of the universe until 1616. He married Luiza de Faria, and they had six children. His wife died in 1600, and he became a Catholic priest despite retaining his Jewish beliefs throughout his retirement.

== Works ==
=== Reportório dos tempos ===
In 1585 Avelar published his first book, Reportorio dos tempos, a collection of works that pertained to astronomy and astrology, with respect to time itself. These works discussed the universe and how it relates to the calendar year. Additionally, his work focused on the religious calendar and the actions one should pursue during a particular lunar phase. Some other authors who produced work in the same genre believed Avelar translated pre-existing books to create Reportorio dos tempos. Although he never references other authors he does make similar remarks and paraphrases certain chapters in his work. An additional four editions of this title were published.

=== Sphaerae vtrivsque tabella ===
Sphaera vtrivsque tabella was published in 1593 and was noted for its similarity to another piece of work created by Johannes de Sacrobosco titled De sphaera mundi or Tractatus de Sphaera. Avelar's commentary in this work was dictated as new as Avelar switched the order and presentation of his predecessor's book. The collection focused on the composition of Earth and its surrounding counterparts in the universe, such as the movements of the sun and terrestrial stars.

== Proceedings of the Inquisition ==
In his retirement, Avelar was suspected of practicing Judaism. The Inquisition officially arrested him on 20 March 1620 as he gave a full confession to following the beliefs of Judaism. Avelar stayed true to his beliefs as a Catholic but would ultimately remain detained and transferred to a prison in Lisbon in 1623. This controversy would also impact the lives of his children, as they all were persecuted for their beliefs in accordance with their father. The Inquisition dealt with matters pertaining to religion or theology; those who taught views differing from those of the Catholic church were put to trial. These proceedings allowed investigations of entire households and sought to find heresy using any methods the Inquisition courts deemed necessary. Avelar was pressured to admit guilt for the sake of his two daughters and son being detained by the Inquisition.
