= Andre Lodemann =

André Lodemann
- Born: 1970 (age 55–56)
- Origin: Germany
- Occupations: DJ, Composer, Producer

André Lodemann (born 1970 in Schwedt/Oder) is a German DJ, composer, producer and label-founder in the field of electronic music (Deep House, Tech House).

== Professional career ==
Lodemann began his career as a DJ in the early 1990s in Frankfurt/Oder and Berlin. His musical influences, coming from jazz, funk, soul, rock and electronic music, including François Kevorkian, Masters At Work, Kerri Chandler, Brian Eno, Peter Gabriel, Weather Report and Talk Talk. His career as a composer and producer started in 2001. Lodemann first released on the Detroit-based Label "Moods N' Grooves" in 2004. With Daniel W. Best he founded the independent music label Best Works Records (BWR) in 2009. Andre Lodemann gained worldwide recognition through his track "Where Are You Now?" and his album "Fragments", both released on BWR. As a remixer he worked with renowned artists like Omar, Tracey Thorn, Black Coffee. His most important releases include works on the influential imprints DFTD and Innervisions.

== Discography ==
=== Albums ===
- 2012: Andre Lodemann - Fragments (Best Works Records)

=== Singles and EPs ===
- 2004: Andre Lodemann - E-Movement EP (Moods & Grooves)
- 2008: Andre Lodemann - Wanna Feel EP (Simple Records)
- 2009: Andre Lodemann - Searching feat. Nathalie Claude EP (Best Works Records)
- 2009: Andre Lodemann - You Never Know EP (Best Works Records)
- 2009: Andre Lodemann - Coming Home EP (Best Works Records)
- 2009: Andre Lodemann - Vehemence Of Silence EP (Room With A View)
- 2010: Andre Lodemann - The Light EP (Best Works Records)
- 2010: Andre Lodemann - Still Dreaming EP (Freerange Records)
- 2011: Andre Lodemann - Don't Panic EP (Room With A View)
- 2011: Andre Lodemann - Riven Reminiscences EP (Freerange Records)
- 2012: Andre Lodemann - Fragments - Originals (Best Works Records)
- 2012: Andre Lodemann - Fragments - Remixes (Best Works Records)
- 2012: Andre Lodemann - Fragments - Where Are You Now? (Best Works Records)
- 2013: Andre Lodemann - Imagine EP (Dessous Recordings)
- 2014: Andre Lodemann - Coming Your Way EP (DFTD)
- 2015: Andre Lodemann - Leaving The Comfort Zone EP (Innervisions)
- 2017: Andre Lodemann - Birth (Best Works Records)

=== Remixes (selection) ===
- 2005: [re:jazz] - Donaueschingen (André Lodemann Club Mix)
- 2005: Rodney Hunter - Take A Ride (André Lodemann Club Ride)
- 2009: Angela K. - Ballad (Andre Lodemann Remix)
- 2010: BlackCoffee feat Zakes Bantwini - JuJu (Andre Lodemann Remix)
- 2010: Tracey Thorn – Why Does The Wind? (Andre Lodemann Remix)
- 2010: Omar - Lay It Down (André Lodemann Remix)
- 2010: Phonique Feat. Ian Whitelaw - Our Time Our Chance (André Lodemann Remix)
- 2010: Akabu - Another World (André Lodemann Remix)
- 2012: Liquideep - Feel It (André Lodemann Remix)
- 2013: Alex Niggemann - Lovers Feat John Rydell (André Lodemann Remix)
- 2014: Cuebur Ft Vikter Duplaix - I See You (André Lodemann Remix)
- 2014: Coyu - Just Nin (He Cries At Night) (André Lodemann Remix)
- 2014: Chopstick & Johnjon - Run Slowly (André Lodemann Remix)
- 2014: Rafael Da Cruz - Rex (André Lodemann Remix)

== See also ==
- List of house music artists
