= André Parmentier (politician) =

French politician

- Born: February 22, 1912; Calais, France
- Died: August 28, 1978 (aged 66)
- Occupation: Politician

André Parmentier (22 February 1912 – 28 August 1978) was a French politician.

Parmentier was born in Calais. He represented the French Section of the Workers' International (SFIO) in the National Assembly from 1956 to 1958.
