= Andreas =

- Pronunciation: Estonian: [ˈɑndreɑs] Finnish: [ˈɑndreɑs] German: [anˈdʁeːas] Swedish: [anˈdrêːas]
- Gender: Male
- Language: Greek, Turkish, Latin, Armenian, German, Dutch, Danish, Swedish, Norwegian, Icelandic, Finnish, Romanian, Brazilian Portuguese, Kurdish, Languages of Ethiopia, Languages of Eritrea

Origin
- Origin: Greek
- Meaning: Man
- Region of origin: Bethsaida, Galilee

Other names
- Nicknames: Andy, Dries (Dutch), Dré (Flemish)
- Related names: Andrew, Anders, André, Onder, Ander, Andy, Andrean, Anderson (surname), An (Chinese surname), Andrei, Andrejs, Andrzej, Andriy, Andrea, Andrey, Andrej, Andrés, Drew, Andres, Antti, Ondřej, Anderman, Vandros, Ondrej, Andrija

Andreas (Greek: Ἀνδρέας) is a name derived from the Greek noun ἀνήρ anēr, with genitive ἀνδρός andros, which means "man". See the article on Andrew for more information. The Scandinavian name is earliest attested as antreos in a runestone from the 12th century.

The name Andrea may be used as a feminine form, but it is also the main masculine form in Italy and the canton of Ticino in Switzerland.

== Given name ==
Andreas is a common name, and this is not a comprehensive list of articles on people named Andreas. See instead.

- Andreus, son of river-god Peneus and founder of Orchomenos in Boeotia
- Andreas of Argos, an ancient Greek sculptor.
- Andreas (physician), the name of one (or possibly several) physicians in ancient Greece
- St. Andrew, Christian apostle
- Saint Andrew of Crete
- Andreas of Alexandria, martyr, saint, and companion to Faustus, Abibus and Dionysius of Alexandria
- Andreas of Caesarea, theological writer and bishop of Caesarea in Cappadocia
- Andreas of Samosata, bishop of Samosata
- Andreas (archbishop of Bari), 11th-century convert to Judaism
- Aindréas of Caithness, or Aindréas (died 1184), first known bishop of Caithness, Scotland
- Andreas (bishop of Dromore), 13th-century Irish cleric
- Andreas Achenbach (1815–1910), German landscape painter
- Andreas Acrivos (1928–2025), Greek-born American physicist
- Andreas Antonius Maria van Agt (1931–2024), Prime Minister of the Netherlands
- Andreas Alciatus (1492–1550), Italian jurist and writer
- Andreas Alföldi (1895–1981), Hungarian historian, epigraphist, numismatist and archaeologist
- Andreas Andersson (footballer, born 1974), Swedish footballer
- Andreas Andersson (footballer, born 1991), Swedish footballer
- Andreas Andersson (ice hockey) (born 1979), Swedish ice hockey goaltender
- Andreas Baader (1943–1977), one of the founding members of the Red Army Faction
- Andreas Friedrich Bauer (1783–1860), German engineer and inventor
- Andreas Bakkerud (born 1991), Norwegian rallycross racing driver
- Andreas Beck (tennis) (born 1986), German tennis player
- Andreas Beck (footballer) (born 1987), German footballer
- Andreas Berger (athlete) (born 1961), Austrian track and field sprinter
- Andreas Berlin (1746–1773), Swedish naturalist
- Andreas Birnbacher (born 1981), German biathlete
- Andreas Bjelland (born 1988), Danish footballer
- Andreas Bourani (born 1983), German singer-songwriter
- Andreas Brehme (1960–2024), German football player and coach
- Andreas Buder (born 1979), Austrian alpine skier
- Andreas Capellanus, writer of De amore
- Andreas Cellarius (c.1596–1665), Dutch-German cartographer
- Andreas Constantinou, Cypriot footballer
- Andreas Christensen, Danish footballer
- Andreas "Andi" Deris, German power metal musician
- Andreas Deuschle (born 1978), German politician
- Andreas Douzos, Greek actor
- Andreas Dückstein (1927–2024), Austrian chess master
- Andreas Embirikos, Greek surrealist poet
- Andreas Ernhofer (born 1997), Austrian Paralympic swimmer
- Andreas Eschbach (born 1959), German science fiction writer
- Andreas Feininger (1906–1999), American photographer
- Andreas Gal (born 1976), German computer scientist and entrepreneur
- Andreas Georgiou (disambiguation)
- Andreas Gianniotis, Greek footballer
- Andreas Glyniadakis, Greek basketball player
- Andreas Granqvist (born 1985), Swedish footballer
- Andreas Gryphius (1616–1664), German lyric poet and dramatist
- Andreas Gursky (born 1955), German photographer
- Andreas Gustafsson (born 1981), Swedish race walker
- Andreas Haider-Maurer (born 1987), Austrian tennis player
- Andreas Haitzer (born 1967), Austrian politician
- Andreas Hanna-Krahl (born 1989), German politician
- Andreas Hartenfels (born 1966), German politician
- Andreas Haukeland (born 1993), also known as TIX, Norwegian singer, songwriter, and producer who is Norway's participant in the Eurovision Song Contest 2021
- Andreas Hillgruber (1925–1989), German military historian
- Andreas Hinterstoisser (1914–1936), German mountaineer
- Andreas Hofer (1767–1810), Tirolean patriot and rebel
- Andreas Hofmeister (born 1980), German politician
- Andreas Holm (politician), Norwegian politician
- Andreas Hug (1964–2000), Swiss karateka and kickboxer
- Andreas Hyperius (1511–1564), Flemish Protestant theologian
- Andreas Isaksson (born 1981), Swedish football goalkeeper
- Andreas Ivanschitz (born 1983), Austrian footballer
- Andreas Johnson (born 1970), Swedish singer-songwriter
- Andreas Johnsson (born 1994), Swedish ice hockey winger
- Andreas Kalvos, Greek poet
- Andreas Kanonidis, Greek basketball player
- Andreas Karkavitsas, Greek writer
- Andreas Karlstadt (1486–1541), German Christian theologian
- Andreas Keith (born 1967), German politician
- Andreas Kiligkaridis, Greek flatwater canoeist
- Andreas Klöden (born 1975), German cyclist
- Andreas Kollross (born 1971), Austrian politician
- Andreas Kontogouris, Greek revolutionary leader during the Greek War of Independence
- Andreas Köpke, German footballer
- Andreas Kriezis, Greek painter
- Andreas Krystallis, Greek painter
- Andreas J. Kumin (born 1965), Austrian jurist and legal scholar
- Andreas Labropoulos, Greek footballer
- Andreas Laskaratos, Greek author
- Andreas Lennkvist Manriquez (born 1994), Swedish politician
- Andreas Linden (born 1965), German javelin thrower
- Andreas Londos, Greek military leader and politician
- Andreas Loverdos, Greek politician
- Andreas Lubitz, German pilot responsible for the Germanwings Flight 9525 crash in 2015
- Andreas Malandrinos (1888–1970), Greek actor
- Andreas Matti (born 1959), Swiss actor
- Andreas Maxsø (born 1994), Danish footballer
- Andreas Metaxas, Greek politician
- Andreas A. Miaoulis, Greek politician
- Andreas D. Miaoulis, Greek politician
- Andreas Vokos Miaoulis, Greek admiral and politician
- Andreas Michalakopoulos, Greek politician
- Andreas Michalopoulos, Greek footballer
- Andreas Mikkelsen, Norwegian rally driver
- Andreas Mikroutsikos, Greek songwriter, singer and TV presenter
- Andreas Mokdasi, Swedish sprinter
- Andreas Möller, German footballer
- Andreas Mouratis, Greek footballer
- Andreas Müller, German painter
- Andreas Musalus, Greek academic
- Andreas Moustoxydis, Greek historian and scholar
- Andreas Niniadis, Greek footballer
- Andreas Odbjerg (born 1987), Danish singer
- Andreas Osiander (1498–1552), German Lutheran theologian
- Andreas Palaiologos, Greek Byzantine emperor
- Andreas Panagopoulos, Greek politician
- Andreas Papandreou, prime minister of Greece
- Andreas Pereira (born 1996), Brazilian footballer
- Andreas Pevernage (1542–1591), Flemish composer
- Andreas P. Pittler, Austrian author
- Andreas Porth (born 1984), German bobsledder
- Andreas Prinz von Sachsen-Coburg und Gotha (1943–2025), German nobility
- Andreas "Andy" Ram (born 1980), Israeli tennis player
- Andreas Roth (Runner), Norwegian middle-distance runner.
- Andreas Roth (Painter), German painter
- Andreas Schalk (born 1984), German politician
- Andreas Schelfhout (1787–1870), Dutch landscape painter
- Andreas Scherer, German ski jumper
- Andreas Schjelderup (born 2004), Norwegian footballer
- Andreas Scholl (born 1967), German opera singer
- Andreas Seelig, East German discus thrower
- Andreas Seppi (born 1984), Italian tennis player
- Andreas Siljeström (born 1981), Swedish tennis player
- Andreas Peter Cornelius Sol (1915–2016), Dutch bishop in Indonesia
- Andreas Sprecher (born 1944), Swiss alpine skier
- Andreas Stamatiadis, Greek footballer
- Andreas Stefanopoulos, Greek politician
- Andreas Steinhöfel (born 1962), German children's writer and translator
- Andreas Stratos, Greek lawyer, politician and historian
- Andreas Syngros, Greek banker and philanthropist
- Andreas Tarasoff, better known under his stage name d3r (born 2003), Canadian Singer
- Andreas Thorkildsen, Norwegian javelin thrower
- Andreas Thorstensson, Swedish web developer
- Andreas Vasilogiannis, Greek footballer
- Andreas Vesalius (1514–1564), Flemish/Netherlandish anatomist and physician
- Andreas Vgenopoulos CEO of Marfin Popular Bank
- Andreas Vinciguerra (born 1981), Siljestrom's Swedish compatriot and tennis player
- Andreas Vlachomitros, Greek footballer
- Andreas Vollenweider (1953–1993), Swiss harpist and composer
- Andreas Voutsinas, Greek actor and director
- Andreas Walser (athlete) (born 1996), German para-athlete
- Andreas Wellinger (born 1995), German ski jumper
- Andreas Whittam Smith (1937–2025), British journalist and editor
- Andreas Zafiropoulos, president of AEK Athens F.C.
- Andreas Zaimis, Greek freedom fighter in the Greek War of Independence
- Andreas Zapatinas, Greek automobile designer
- Andreas "Akis" Zikos, Greek footballer
- Andreas Zisimos, Greek freestyle swimmer
- Andreas Zuber (born 1983), Austrian auto racing driver
- Andreas Zülow (born 1965), East German boxer

== Surname ==
- Alfred T. Andreas (1839–1900), American publisher and historian
- Casper Andreas (born 1972), American actor and film director
- Dwayne Andreas (1918–2016), American businessman
- Harry Andreas (1879–1955), Australian businessman and company director
- Lisa Andreas (born 1987), English singer

== Places ==
- Andreas, Isle of Man, a village and parish in the Isle of Man

== See also ==
- San Andreas (disambiguation)
