= Edwin M. Truman =

American economist (born 1941)

- Born: June 3, 1941 (age 84)

Academic work
- Discipline: International financial institutions
- Website: Information at IDEAS / RePEc

Edwin (Ted) M. Truman (born 1941) is an American economist specializing in international financial institutions, especially the International Monetary Fund and sovereign wealth funds. He has been a Senior Fellow with the Peterson Institute for International Economics since 2001. Truman has worked quietly over the years on international financial crises issues. Nobel laureate Paul Krugman described Truman as the "George Smiley of international economics".

== Family background and education ==
The son of political scientist David Truman, Edwin Truman was awarded a BA from Amherst College in 1963, and a Ph.D. in economics from Yale University in 1976. In 1988 Amherst College awarded him an Honorary LL.D.

== Career ==
From 1977 to 1998 Truman directed the Division of International Finance at the Federal Reserve System

From 1983 to 1998 he was a staff economist for the Federal Open Market Committee.

In December 1998, President Bill Clinton, appointed Truman Assistant Secretary of the US Treasury for International Affairs.

In 2001, he joined the Peterson Institute for International Economics as a Senior Fellow.

In 2009, he was recruited by Treasury Secretary Timothy Geithner as a temporary advisor to develop policies for the April 2009 G-20 London summit

Currently, he is on the advisory board of OMFIF where he writes various articles regarding the monetary and financial situation.

== Policy work ==
Truman has been a member of many international organizations and working groups. He has been a member of:

- G-7 Working Group on Exchange Market Intervention (1982–83)
- G-10 Working Group on the Resolution of Sovereign Liquidity Crises (1995–96)
- G-10-sponsored Working Party on Financial Stability in Emerging Market Economies (1996–97)
- G-22 Working Party on Transparency and Accountability (1998)
- Financial Stability Forum's Working Group on Highly Leveraged Institutions (1999–2000)

Truman is a supporter of the IMF. He has proposed a special, on-time allocation of $250bn in SDRs by donor member countries as a way of dramatically building confidence in co-operative solutions to the global recession and to persuade countries not to manage their exchange rates in order to build up foreign exchange surpluses. He urged the G-20 'to commit to substantial and sustained actions for a period that matches the likely duration of the crisis'. Truman urged that IMF should enforce the coordinated plan, that it should keep a real-time, public scorecard identifying countries which are not doing their part.

== Advocacy ==
Truman has led international advocacy efforts to defend Andreas Georgiou, the former head of the Hellenic Statistical Authority who has been the target of multiple prosecutions and lawsuits.

== Bibliography ==
- Edwin M Truman (2003). Inflation Targeting in the World Economy. Columbia University Press. ISBN 978-0-88132-450-1.
- Edwin M. Truman (2006). A Strategy for IMF Reform. Peterson Institute. ISBN 978-0-88132-398-6.
- Edwin M. Truman (2010). Sovereign Wealth Funds: Threat Or Salvation?. Peterson Institute. ISBN 978-0-88132-575-1.
