= Andreas Georgiou =

Andreas Georgiou may refer to:

- Andreas Georgiou Papandreou (1919–1996), prime minister of Greece from 1981–1989 and 1993–1996
- Andreas Georgiou Thomas (1942–2002), Cypriot poet
- Andreas Georgiou (politician) (1953–2021), Cypriot politician
- Andreas Georgiou (economist) (born 1960), Greek economist
