= Önder =

Önder is a Turkish given name for males and a Turkish surname with the meaning “leader“. Notable people named Önder include:

== Given name ==
- Önder Çengel (born 1982), Turkish-Swiss footballer
- Önder Sisters (born 1965), Ferhan Önder and Ferzan Önder, Turkish twin sister classical pianists
- Önder Şipal (born 1987), Turkish boxer
- Önder Turacı (born 1981), Turkish footballer

== Surname ==
- Aysel Önder (born 2005), Turkish Paralympian female athlete
- Fazıl Önder (1926–1958), Turkish Cypriot journalist
- Sırrı Süreyya Önder (1962–2025), Turkish film director, actor, screenwriter, columnist and politician

== See also ==
- Onder
