= Council of Ephesus =

Ecumenical council in Ephesus in 431, convened by Emperor Theodosius II

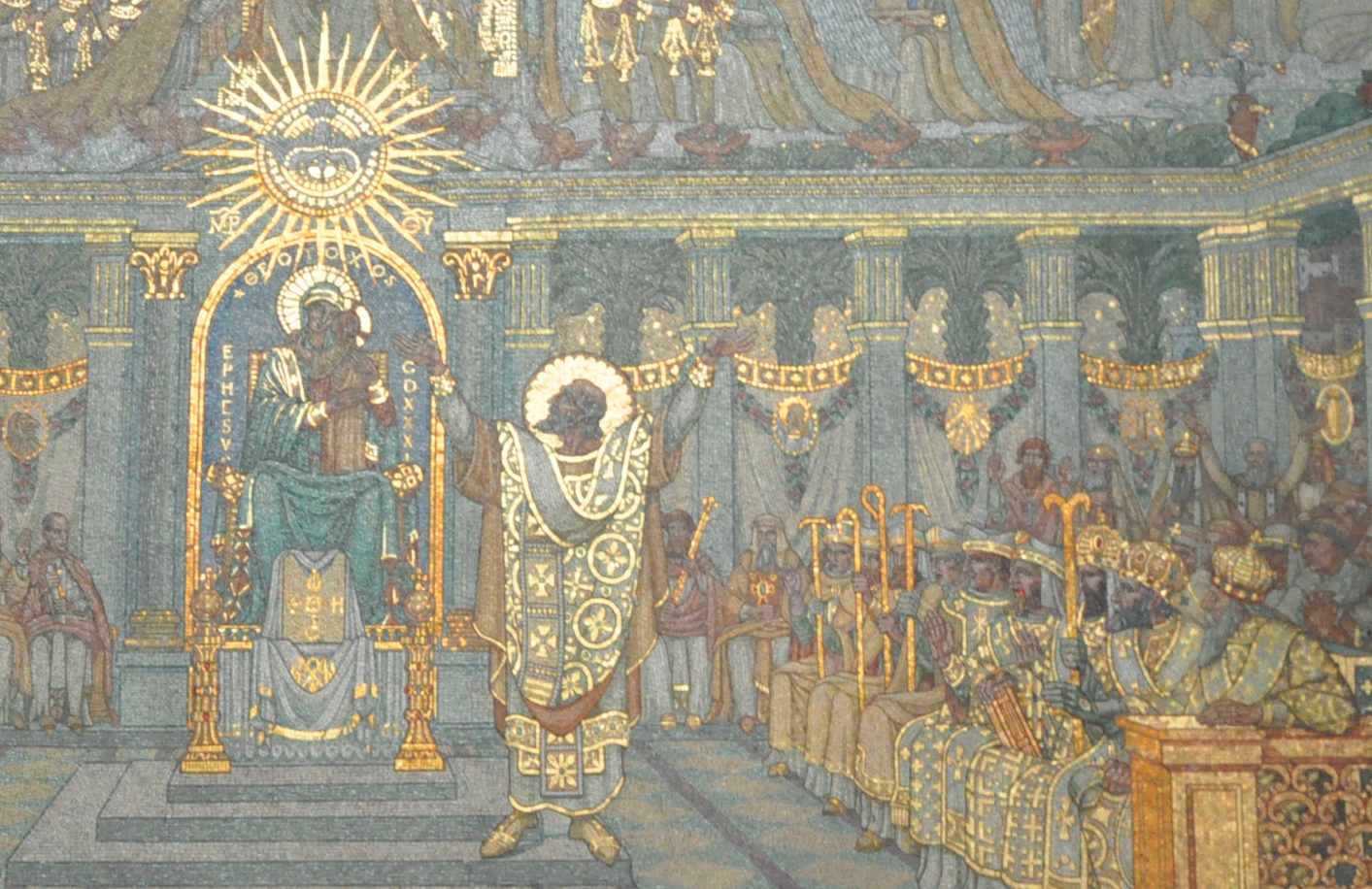
- Image in the church Notre-Dame de Fourvières, France. The priest standing right in the middle is Cyril of Alexandria. On the throne are the Virgin Mary and child Jesus.
- Date: 22 June – 31 July 431
- Accepted by: Catholic Church; Eastern Orthodox Church; Oriental Orthodox Churches; Old Catholics; Lutheranism; Anglicanism; Calvinism
- Previous council: First Council of Constantinople
- Next council: Council of Chalcedon (Chalcedonian); Second Council of Ephesus (Oriental Orthodox)
- Convoked by: Emperor Theodosius II
- President: Patriarch Cyril of Alexandria
- Attendance: 200–250 (representatives of the Western Church arrived late to the council)
- Topics: Nestorianism, Theotokos, Pelagianism
- Documents and statements: Confirmation of the original Nicene Creed, declaration of Mary as Theotokos, condemnations of some heresies, 8 canons

The Council of Ephesus was a council of Christian bishops convened in Ephesus (near present-day Selçuk in Turkey) in AD 431 by the Roman emperor Theodosius II. This third ecumenical council, an effort to attain consensus in the church through an assembly representing all of Christendom, confirmed the original Nicene Creed, and condemned the teachings of Nestorius, Patriarch of Constantinople, who preferred that the Virgin Mary be called Christotokos, "Christ-bearer" over Theotokos, "God-bearer"; in contrast to Cyril of Alexandria who deemed that Theotokos is enough on its own. It met from 22 June to 31 July 431 at the Church of Mary in Ephesus in Anatolia.

== Background ==
Nestorius' doctrine, Nestorianism, which emphasized the distinction between Christ's human and divine natures and argued that Mary should preferably be called Christotokos (Christ-bearer) over Theotokos (God-bearer), had brought him into conflict with other church leaders, most notably Cyril, Patriarch of Alexandria. Nestorius himself had requested the Emperor to convene the council, hoping that it would prove his orthodoxy; the council in fact condemned his teachings as heresy. The council declared Mary as Theotokos (Mother of God).

Nestorius' dispute with Cyril had led the latter to seek validation from Pope Celestine I, who offered his support for Cyril to request that Nestorius recant his position or face excommunication. Nestorius pleaded with the Eastern Roman Emperor Theodosius II to call a council in which all grievances could be aired, hoping that he would be vindicated and Cyril condemned.

Approximately 250 bishops were present. The proceedings were conducted in a heated atmosphere of confrontation and recriminations and created severe tensions between Cyril and Theodosius II. Nestorius was decisively outplayed by Cyril and removed from his see, and his teachings were officially anathematized. This precipitated the Nestorian Schism, by which churches supportive of Nestorius, especially in the Persian Empire of the Sassanids, were severed from the rest of Christendom and became known as Nestorian Christianity, or the Church of the East, whose present-day representatives are the Assyrian Church of the East, the Ancient Church of the East, the Chaldean Syrian Church, and the Chaldean Catholic Church (which restored communion with Rome).

== History ==
=== Political context ===
John McGuckin cites the "innate rivalry" between Alexandria and Constantinople as an important factor in the controversy between Cyril of Alexandria and Nestorius. However, he emphasizes that, as much as political competition contributed to an "overall climate of dissent", the controversy cannot be reduced merely to the level of "personality clashes" or "political antagonisms". According to McGuckin, Cyril viewed the "elevated intellectual argument about Christology" as ultimately one and the same as the "validity and security of the simple Christian life".

Even within Constantinople, some supported the Roman-Alexandrian, and others supported the Nestorian factions. For example, Pulcheria supported the Roman-Alexandrian popes while the emperor and his wife supported Nestorius.

=== Theological context ===
Contention over Nestorius' teachings, which he developed during his studies at the School of Antioch, largely revolved around his rejection of the long-used title Theotokos ("Carrier of God") for the Virgin Mary. Shortly after his arrival in Constantinople, Nestorius became involved in the disputes of two theological factions, which differed in their Christology.

McGuckin ascribes Nestorius' importance to his being the representative of the Antiochene (an adjectival form of the word 'Antioch') tradition and characterizes him as a "consistent, if none too clear, exponent of the longstanding Antiochene dogmatic tradition". Nestorius was greatly surprised that what he had always taught in Antioch without any controversy whatsoever should prove to be so objectionable to the Christians of Constantinople. Nestorius emphasized the dual natures of Christ, trying to find a middle ground between those who emphasized the fact that in Christ God had been born as a man, and who insisted on calling the Virgin Mary Theotokos (Greek: Θεοτόκος, "God-bearer"), and those that rejected that title because God as an eternal being could not have been born. Nestorius suggested the title Christotokos (Χριστοτόκος, "Christ-bearer"), but this proposal did not gain acceptance on either side.

Nestorius tried to answer a question: "How can Jesus Christ be God and man at the same time?" He taught that Mary, the mother of Jesus gave birth to the incarnate Christ, not the divine Logos, which referred to the Logos in its divine nature, according to Antiochene usage, who existed before Mary and indeed before time itself. Consequently, Nestorius argued that the Virgin Mary should be called Christotokos, Greek for "Carrier of Christ", and not only Theotokos, Greek for "Carrier of God".

According to McGuckin, several mid-twentieth-century accounts have tended to "romanticise" Nestorius; in opposition to this view, he asserts that Nestorius was no less dogmatic and uncompromising than Cyril, and that he was clearly just as prepared to use his political and canonical powers as Cyril or any of the other hierarchs of the period.

Nestorius's opponents charged him with detaching Christ's divinity and humanity into two persons existing in one body, thereby denying the reality of the Incarnation. Eusebius, a layman who later became the bishop of the neighbouring Dorylaeum, was the first to accuse Nestorius of heresy, but his most forceful opponent was Patriarch Cyril of Alexandria. Cyril argued that Nestorius's two-natures formula necessarily leads to two Sons.

Cyril appealed to Pope Celestine I of Rome, charging Nestorius with heresy. The Pope agreed and gave Cyril his authority to serve a notice to Nestorius to recant his views within ten days or else be excommunicated. Before acting on the Pope's commission, Cyril convened a synod of Egyptian bishops, which condemned Nestorius as well. Cyril then sent four suffragan bishops to deliver both the Pope's commission as well as the synodal letter of the Egyptian bishops. Cyril sent a letter to Nestorius known as the "Third Epistle of Saint Cyril to Nestorius". This epistle drew heavily on the established Patristic Constitutions and contained the most famous article of Alexandrian Orthodoxy: "The Twelve Anathemas of Saint Cyril". In these anathemas, Cyril excommunicated anyone who followed the teachings of Nestorius. For example, "Anyone who dares to deny the Holy Virgin the title Theotokos is Anathema!" Nestorius, however, still would not repent. McGuckin points out that other representatives of the Antiochene tradition such as John of Antioch, Theodoret and Andrew of Samosata were able to recognize "the point of the argument for Christ's integrity" and concede the "ill-advised nature of Nestorius' immoveability". Concerned at the potential for a negative result at a council, they urged Nestorius to yield and accept the use of the title Theotokos when referring to the Virgin Mary.

For example, John of Antioch wrote to Nestorius urging him to submit to the Pope's judgment and cease stirring up controversy over a word that he disliked (Theotokos) but which could be interpreted as having an orthodox meaning especially in light of the fact that many saints and doctors of the church had sanctioned the word by using it themselves. John wrote to Nestorius, "Don't lose your head. Ten days! It will not take you twenty-four hours to give the needed answer.... Ask advice of men you can trust. Ask them to tell you the facts, not just what they think will please you.... You have the whole of the East against you, as well as Egypt." Despite this advice from his colleagues, Nestorius persisted in maintaining the rightness of his position.

=== Convocation ===
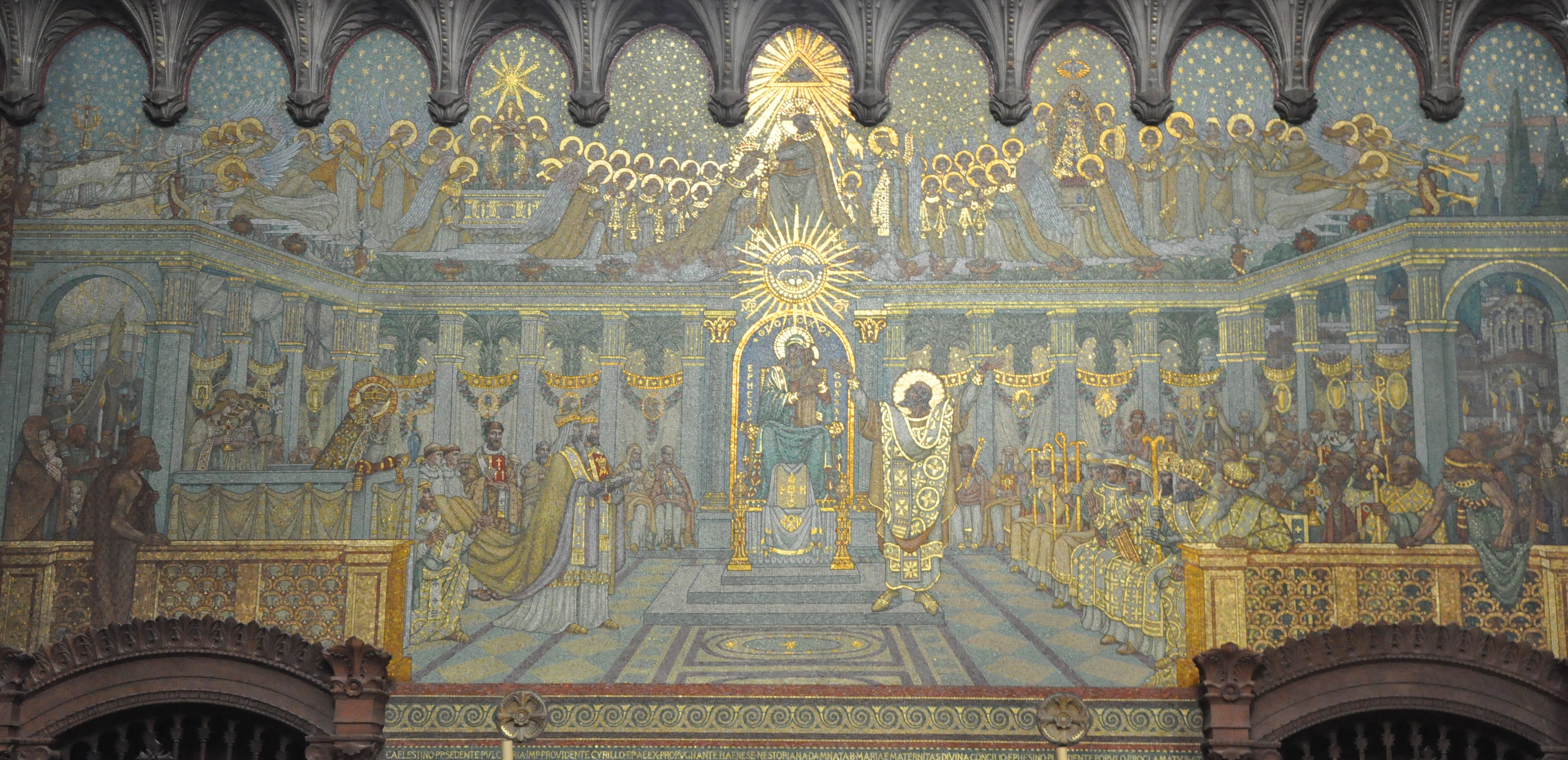
Council of Ephesus in 431, in the Basilica of Fourvière, Lyon

On 19 November, Nestorius, anticipating the ultimatum decision which was about to be delivered, convinced Emperor Theodosius II to summon a general council through which Nestorius hoped to convict Cyril of heresy and thereby vindicate his own teachings. Theodosius issued a Sacra calling for the metropolitan bishops to assemble in the city of Ephesus, which was a special seat for the veneration of Mary, where the theotokos formula was popular. Each bishop was to bring only his more eminent suffragans. The date set by the Emperor for the opening of the council was Pentecost (7 June) 431.

McGuckin notes that the vagueness of the Sacra resulted in wide variations of interpretation by different bishops. In particular, the vastness of John of Antioch's ecclesiastical territory required a lengthy period to notify and gather his delegates. Because the overland trip from Antioch to Ephesus was long and arduous, John composed his delegation of his metropolitan bishops, who were restricted to bring no more than two suffragans each. By doing so, he minimized the number who would have to travel to Ephesus. Neither of the emperors attended the council. Theodosius appointed Count Candidian as the head of the imperial palace guard to represent him, to supervise the proceedings of the Council, and to keep good order in the city of Ephesus. Despite Nestorius' agenda of prosecuting Cyril, Theodosius intended for the council to focus strictly on the christological controversy. He thus gave Candidian strict directions to remain neutral and not to interfere in the theological proceedings. It is generally assumed that Candidian initially maintained his neutrality as instructed by the emperor and only gradually became more biased towards Nestorius. McGuckin, however, suggests that Candidian may have favored Nestorius from the start.

=== Assembly ===
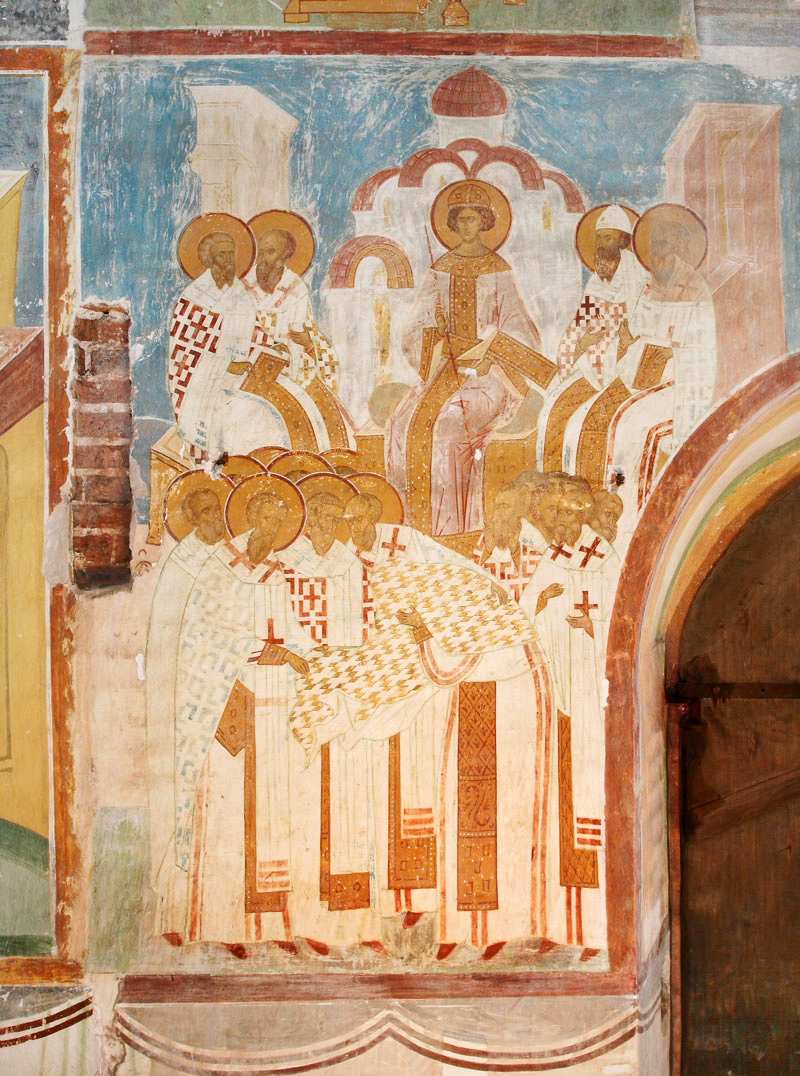
Council of Ephesus, fresco at Ferapontov Monastery, c. 1502.

Celestine sent Arcadius and Projectus to represent himself and his Roman council; in addition, he sent the Roman priest, Philip, as his personal representative. Cyril, Patriarch of Alexandria, was president of the council. Celestine had directed the papal legates not to take part in the discussions but to give judgment on them.

Bishops arrived in Ephesus over a period of several weeks. While waiting for the other bishops to arrive, they engaged in informal discussions characterized as tending to "exasperate rather than heal their differences" The metropolitan of Ephesus, Memnon, was already present with his 52 bishops. Nestorius and his 16 bishops were the first to arrive shortly after Easter. As archbishop of the imperial city of Constantinople, he travelled with a detachment of troops who were under the command of Count Candidian. McGuckin notes that the troops were not there to serve as Nestorius' bodyguard but to support Candidian in his role as the emperor's representative. However, McGuckin theorizes that Candidian's progressive abandonment of neutrality in favor of Nestorius may have created the perception that Candidian's troops were, in fact, there to support Nestorius. Candidian ordered all monks and lay strangers to leave the city; he further instructed the bishops not to leave on any pretext until the council was concluded. Several sources comment that the purpose of this injunction was to prevent bishops from leaving the council to appeal to the emperor directly.

According to McGuckin, Memnon, as bishop of Ephesus, commanded the "fervent and unquestioned loyalty" of the local populace and thus could count on the support of local factions to counterbalance the military might of Candidian's troops. In view of the verdict of Rome against Nestorius, Memnon refused to have communion with Nestorius, closing the churches of Ephesus to him.

Cyril brought with him 50 bishops, arriving only a few days before Pentecost. There were very few bishops representing the West, as the papal representatives would not arrive until July. The Palestinian delegation of 16 bishops and Metropolitan Flavian of Philippi arrived five days after the date that had been set for opening the council and aligned themselves with Cyril.

At this point, Cyril announced his intention to open the council; however, Candidian enjoined him from doing so on the grounds that the Roman and Antiochean delegations had not arrived yet. Cyril initially acceded to Candidian's injunction knowing that he could not legally convene a council without the official reading of the Emperor's Sacra.

A number of bishops, who were undecided between Nestorius and Cyril, did not want to give Cyril, as one party in the dispute, the right to chair the meeting and decide the agenda; however, they began to take Cyril's side for various reasons.

Various circumstances, including a detour necessitated by flooding as well as sickness and death of some of the delegates, seriously delayed John of Antioch and his bishops. It was rumored that John might be delaying his arrival in order to avoid participating in a council which was likely to condemn Nestorius as a heretic.

=== First session – 22 June 431 ===
Two weeks after the date set for the council, John and the bulk of his Syrian group (42 members) had not yet appeared. At this point, Cyril formally opened the council on Monday, 22 June by enthroning the Gospels in the center of the church as a symbol of Christ's presence among the assembled bishops.

Despite three separate summons, Nestorius refused to acknowledge Cyril's authority to stand in judgment of him and considered the opening of the council before the arrival of the Antiochene contingent as a "flagrant injustice". The 68 bishops who opposed opening the council entered the church in protest, arriving with Count Candidian who declared that the assembly was illegal and must disperse. He urged Cyril to wait four more days for the Syrian delegation to arrive. However, since even the bishops opposed to opening the council were now present, Cyril maneuvered Candidian by means of a ruse to read out the text of the Emperor's decree of convocation, which the assembly then acclaimed as recognition of its own legality.

=== Arrival of the Antiochene delegation ===
When John of Antioch and his Syrian bishops finally reached Ephesus five days after the council, they met with Candidian who informed them that Cyril had begun a council without them and had ratified Celestine's conviction of Nestorius as a heretic. Angered at having undertaken such a long and arduous journey only to have been pre-empted by actions taken by Cyril's council, John and the Syrian bishops held their own Council with Candidian presiding. This council condemned Cyril for espousing the Arian, Apollinarian and Eunomian heresies and condemned Memnon for inciting violence. The bishops at this council deposed both Cyril and Memnon. Initially, the emperor concurred with the actions of John's council but eventually withdrew his concurrence.

=== Second Session – 10 July 431 ===
The second session was held in Memnon's episcopal residence. Philip, as papal legate, opened the proceedings by commenting that the present question regarding Nestorius had already been decided by Pope Celestine as evidenced by his letter, which had been read to the assembled bishops in the first session. He indicated that he had a second letter from Celestine, which was read to the bishops now in attendance. The letter contained a general exhortation to the council, and concluded by saying that the legates had instructions to carry out what the pope had decided on the question and expressed Celestine's confidence that the council would agree. The bishops indicated their approval by acclaiming Celestine and Cyril. Projectus indicated that the papal letter enjoined the council to put into effect the sentence pronounced by Celestine. Firmus, the Exarch of Caesarea in Cappadocia, responded that the pope's sentence had already been carried out in the first session. The session closed with the reading of the pope's letter to the emperor.

=== Third Session – 11 July 431 ===
Having read the Acts of the first session, the papal legates indicated that all that was required was that the council's condemnation of Nestorius be formally read in their presence. When this had been done, the three legates each confirmed the council's actions, signing the Acts of all three sessions. The council sent a letter to Theodosius indicating that the condemnation of Nestorius had been agreed upon not only by the bishops of the East meeting in Ephesus but also of the bishops of the West who had convened at a synod in Rome convened by Celestine. The bishops asked Theodosius to allow them to go home since so many of them suffered from their presence at Ephesus.

=== Fourth Session – 16 July 431 ===
At the fourth session, Cyril and Memnon presented a formal protest against John of Antioch for convening a separate conciliabulum. The council issued a summons for him to appear before them, but he would not even receive the envoys who were sent to serve him the summons.

=== Fifth Session – 17 July 431 ===
The next day, the fifth session was held in the same church. John had set up a placard in the city accusing the synod of the Apollinarian heresy. He was again cited, and this was counted as the third canonical summons. He paid no attention. In consequence, the council suspended and excommunicated him, together with thirty-four bishops of his party, but refrained from deposing them. Some of John's party had already deserted him, and he had gained only a few. In the letters to the emperor and the pope, which were then dispatched, the synod described itself as now consisting of 210 bishops. The long letter to Celestine gave a full account of the council and mentioned that the pope's decrees against the Pelagians had been read and confirmed.

=== Sixth Session – 22 July 431 ===
At this session, the bishops approved Canon 7, which condemned any departure from the creed established by the First Council of Nicaea, in particular an exposition by the priest Charisius. According to a report from Cyril to Celestine, Juvenal of Jerusalem tried and failed to create for himself a patriarchate from the territory of the Antiochene patriarchate in which his see lay. He ultimately succeeded in this goal twenty years later at the Council of Chalcedon.

=== Seventh Session – 31 August 431 ===
At this session, the council approved the claim of the bishops of Cyprus that their see had been anciently and rightly exempt from the jurisdiction of Antioch. The council also passed five canons condemning Nestorius and Caelestius and their followers as heretics and a sixth one decreeing deposition from clerical office or excommunication for those who did not accept the Council's decrees.

== Canons and declarations ==
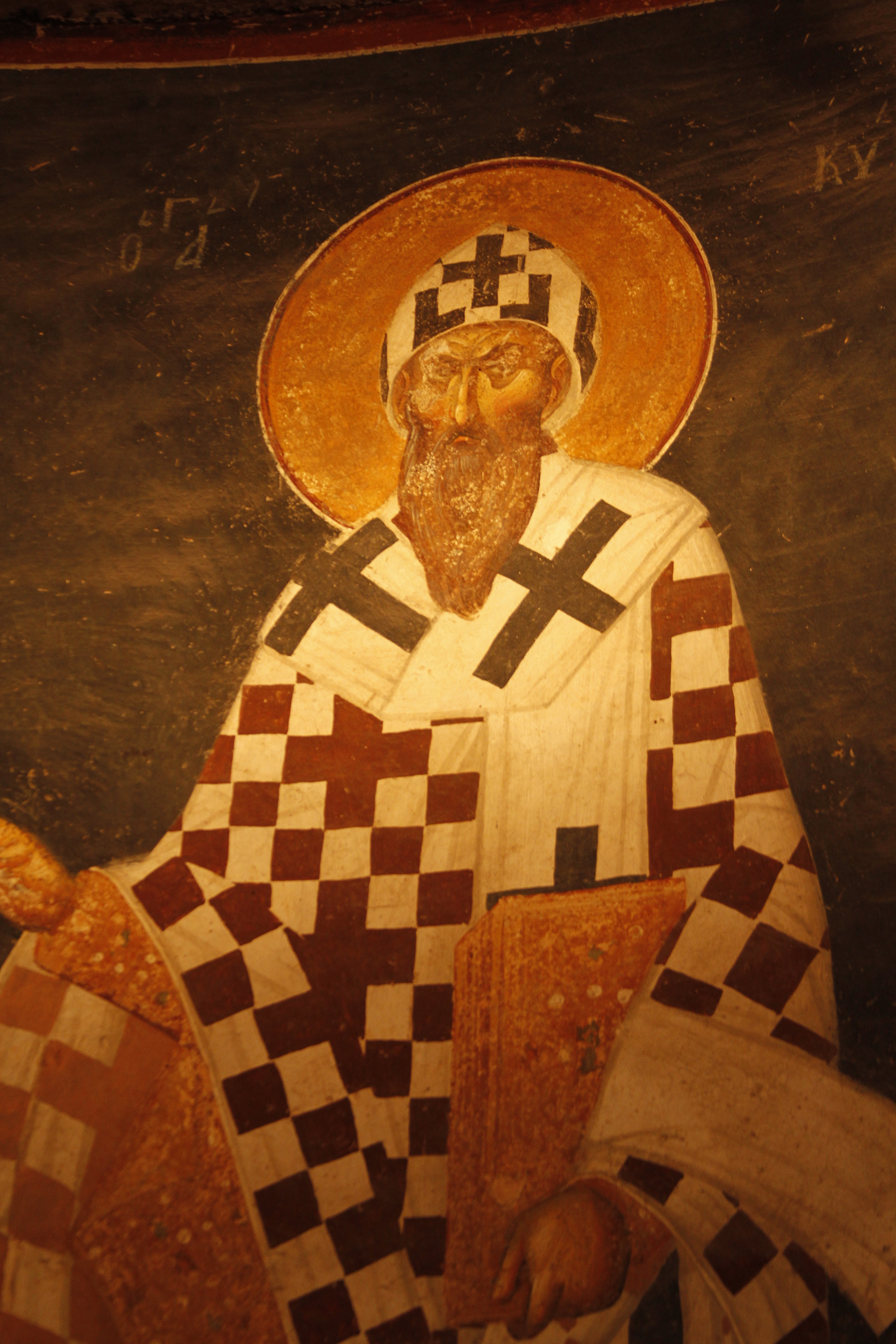
Cyril of Alexandria

Eight canons were passed:

- Canon 1–5 condemned Nestorius and Caelestius and their followers as heretics
- Canon 6 decreed deposition from clerical office or excommunication for those who did not accept the Council's decrees
- Canon 7 condemned any departure from the creed established by the First Council of Nicaea (325), in particular an exposition by the priest Charisius.
- Canon 8 condemned interference by the Bishop of Antioch in affairs of the Church in Cyprus and decreed generally, that no bishop was to "assume control of any province which has not heretofore, from the very beginning, been under his own hand or that of his predecessors […] lest the Canons of the Fathers be transgressed".

The Council denounced Nestorius' teaching as erroneous and decreed that Jesus was one person (hypostasis), and not two separate persons, yet possessing both a human and divine nature. The Virgin Mary was to be called Theotokos, a Greek word that means "God-bearer" (the one who gave birth to God).

The Council declared it "unlawful for any man to bring forward, or to write, or to compose a different (ἑτέραν) Faith as a rival to that established by the holy Fathers assembled with the Holy Ghost in Nicæa". It quoted the Nicene Creed as adopted by the First Council of Nicaea in 325, not as added to and modified by the First Council of Constantinople in 381.

Although some scholars, such as Norman Cohn and Peter Toon, have suggested that the Council of Ephesus rejected premillennialism, this is a misconception, and there is no evidence of the Council making any such declaration.

== Confirmation of the Council's acts ==
The bishops at Cyril's council outnumbered those at John of Antioch's council by nearly four to one. In addition, they had the agreement of the papal legates and the support of the population of Ephesus who supported their bishop, Memnon.

However, Count Candidian and his troops supported Nestorius as did Count Irenaeus. The emperor had always been a firm supporter of Nestorius but had been somewhat shaken by the reports of the council. Cyril's group was unable to communicate with the emperor because of interference from supporters of Nestorius both at Constantinople and at Ephesus. Ultimately, a messenger disguised as a beggar was able to carry a letter to Constantinople by hiding it in a hollow cane.

Although Emperor Theodosius had long been a staunch supporter of Nestorius, his loyalty seems to have been shaken by the reports from Cyril's council and caused him to arrive at the extraordinary decision to ratify the depositions decreed by both councils. Thus, he declared that Cyril, Memnon, and John were all deposed. Memnon and Cyril were kept in close confinement. But in spite of all the efforts of the Antiochene party, the representatives of the envoys whom the council was eventually allowed to send, with the legate Philip, to the Court, persuaded the emperor to accept Cyril's council as the true one.

Seeing the writing on the wall and anticipating his fate, Nestorius requested permission to retire to his former monastery. The synod was dissolved in the beginning of October, and Cyril arrived back to Alexandria amid much joy on 30 October 431. Pope Celestine had died on 27 July 431, but his successor, Sixtus III, gave papal confirmation to the council's actions.

== Aftermath ==
Christological spectrum during the 5th–7th centuries showing the views of The Church of the East (light blue), Miaphysite (light red) and the western churches i.e. Eastern Orthodox and Catholic (light purple)

The events created a major schism between the followers of the different versions of the council, which was only mended by difficult negotiations. The factions that supported John of Antioch acquiesced in the condemnation of Nestorius and, after additional clarifications, accepted the decisions of Cyril's council. However, the rift would open again during the debates leading up to the Council of Chalcedon.

Persia had long been home to a Christian community that had been persecuted by the Zoroastrian majority, which had accused it of Roman leanings. In 424, the Persian Church declared itself independent of the Byzantine and all other churches, in order to ward off allegations of foreign allegiance. Following the Nestorian Schism, the Persian Church increasingly aligned itself with the Nestorians, a measure encouraged by the Zoroastrian ruling class. The Persian Church became increasingly Nestorian in doctrine over the next decades, furthering the divide between Christianity in Persia and in the Roman Empire. In 486 the Metropolitan of Nisibis, Barsauma, publicly accepted Nestorius' mentor, Theodore of Mopsuestia, as a spiritual authority. In 489 when the School of Edessa in Mesopotamia was closed by Byzantine Emperor Zeno for its Nestorian teachings, the school relocated to its original home of Nisibis, becoming again the School of Nisibis, leading to a wave of Nestorian immigration into Persia. The Persian patriarch Mar Babai I (497–502) reiterated and expanded upon the church's esteem for Theodore, solidifying the church's adoption of Nestorianism.

=== Conciliation ===
In 1994, the Common Christological Declaration Between the Catholic Church and the Assyrian Church of the East marked the resolution of a dispute between those two churches that had existed since the Council of Ephesus. They expressed their common understanding of doctrine concerning the divinity and humanity of Christ, and recognized the legitimacy and rightness of their respective descriptions of Mary as, on the Catholic side, "the Mother of Christ our God and Saviour", and, on the Assyrian side, as "the Mother of God" and also as "the Mother of Christ".

== See also ==
- Cyril of Alexandria
- Nestorius of Constantinople
- Council of Chalcedon
- Oriental Orthodox Churches

== Sources ==
- Bethune-Baker, James F. (1908). Nestorius and His Teaching: A Fresh Examination of the Evidence. Cambridge: Cambridge University Press. ISBN 978-1-10743298-7.
- Grillmeier, Aloys (1975) [1965]. Christ in Christian Tradition: From the Apostolic Age to Chalcedon (451) (2nd revised ed.). Louisville: Westminster John Knox Press. ISBN 978-0-66422301-4.
- McGuckin, John A. (1994). St. Cyril of Alexandria: The Christological Controversy: Its History, Theology, and Texts. Leiden: Brill. ISBN 978-900431290-6.
- Loon, Hans van (2009). The Dyophysite Christology of Cyril of Alexandria. Leiden-Boston: Brill. ISBN 978-900417322-4.
- Loofs, Friedrich (1914). Nestorius and his Place in the History of Christian Doctrine. Cambridge: Cambridge University Press. ISBN 978-1-10745076-9.
- Meyendorff, John (1989). Imperial unity and Christian divisions: The Church 450–680 A.D. Crestwood, NY: St. Vladimir's Seminary Press. ISBN 978-0-88141056-3.
- Norris, Richard A., ed. (1980). The Christological Controversy. Minneapolis: Fortess Press. ISBN 978-0-80061411-9.
- Pásztori-Kupán, István (2006). Theodoret of Cyrus. London & New York: Routledge. ISBN 978-1-13439176-9.
- Seleznyov, Nikolai N. (2010). "Nestorius of Constantinople: Condemnation, Suppression, Veneration: With special reference to the role of his name in East-Syriac Christianity". Journal of Eastern Christian Studies. 62 (3–4): 165–190.
- Wessel, Susan (2004). Cyril of Alexandria and the Nestorian Controversy: The Making of a Saint and of a Heretic. Oxford: Oxford University Press. ISBN 978-0-19-926846-7.
