= Athanasios Thanopoulos =

European civil servant and Greek economist

- Αθανάσιος Θανόπουλος
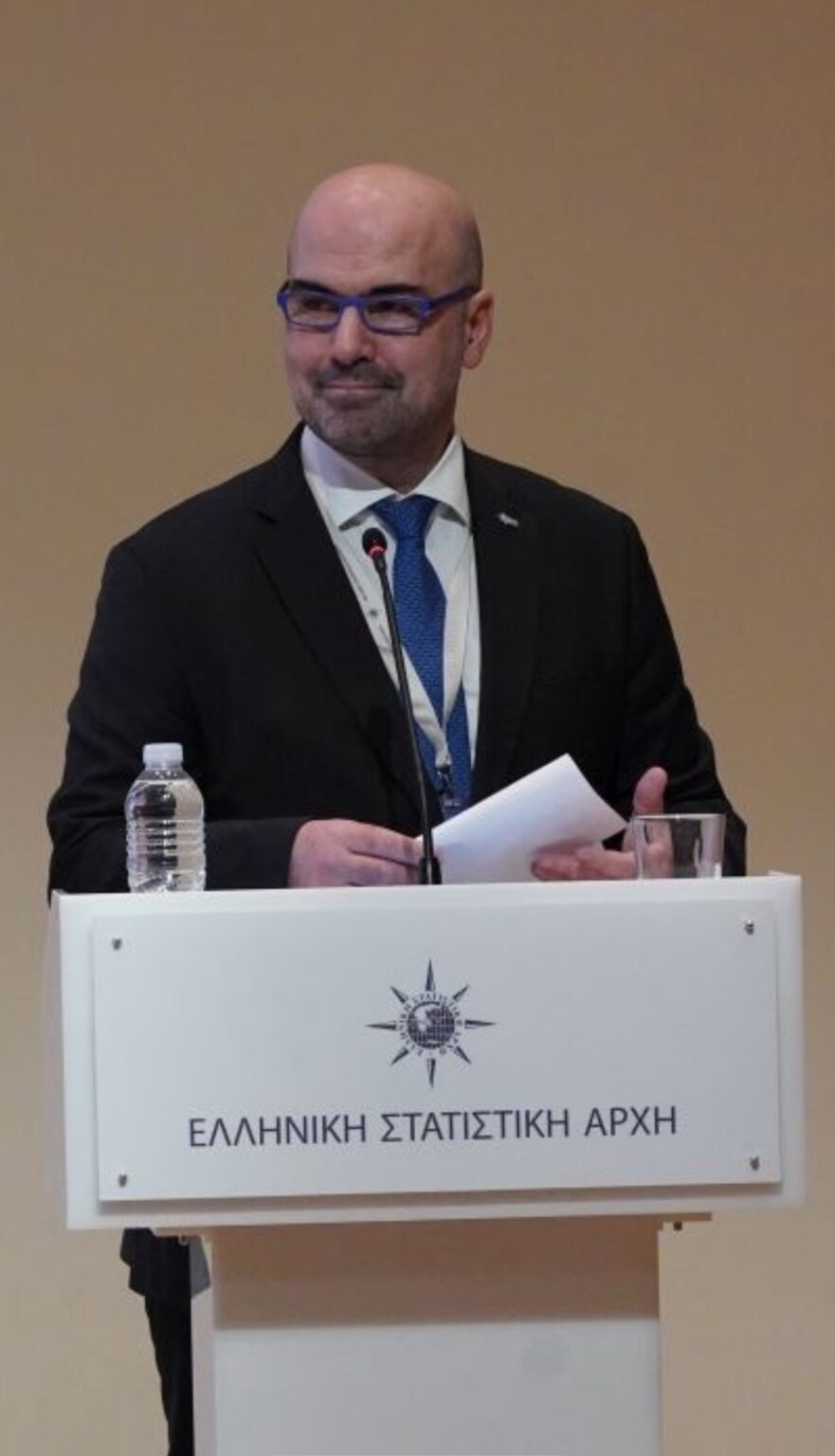
- Athanasios in 2025

Deputy Director-General at Eurostat
- Incumbent
- Assumed office 16 December 2025
- Commission: Von der Leyen II

President of the Hellenic Statistical Authority
- In office February 2016 – December 2025

Personal details
- Born: 1970 (age 55–56) Greece
- Citizenship: Greece
- Education: National and Kapodistrian University of Athens; Toulouse School of Economics; University of Pittsburgh (PhD)
- Occupation: European civil servant
- Profession: Economist, statistician

Military service
- Allegiance: Greece
- Branch/service: Hellenic Air Force
- Years of service: 1994-1996

Athanasios Thanopoulos (Greek: Αθανάσιος Θανόπουλος) is a European civil servant of Greek nationality who has served as Deputy Director-General at Eurostat, the statistical office of the European Union, since December 2025. Eurostat, also known as DG ESTAT, is formally part of the European Commission. Prior to that, Thanopoulos was President of the Hellenic Statistical Authority for almost a decade and, from 2022, he was Chairman of the European Statistical System (ESS) Partnership Group, whose objective is to gradually build up the conditions for providing comparable statistics at EU level through partnerships between Eurostat, the national statistical institutes of member states and other national authorities.

== Education ==
Athanasios Thanopoulos completed his four-year bachelor's degree in economics at the National and Kapodistrian University of Athens in 1997. The following year, Thanopoulos moved to Toulouse to study at the Toulouse School of Economics, affiliated to the Toulouse Capitole University. He obtained a Diplôme d'études approfondies (DEA), a high-level research master's degree, in mathematical economics and econometrics in 1998 and a European Diploma in Advanced Quantitative Economics the following year. Thanopoulous completed his PhD in Economics at the economics department of the University of Pittsburgh.

== Career ==
Athanasios Thanopoulos worked as a researcher at the National and Kapodistrian University of Athens from 2000 to 2001, also giving lectures at the National Technical University of Athens. In 2000, he also joined the Greek environment ministry as an economist. From 2001 to 2006, he returned to the US to work as a lecturer and teaching fellow at the University of Pittsburgh, where he had undertaken his doctoral studies. In 2010, returning to Athens, he became an assistant professor at the National Technical University and an adjunct professor at the National and Kapodistrian University.

Simultaneously, Athanasios Thanopoulos was appointed Senior Economist in the Economic Research & Analysis Unit of the Council of Economic Advisers, an advisory body of the Greek finance ministry. In this capacity, he advised notably on statistical governance, the quality of official statistics, the design of bank recapitalisation and resolution schemes, social security and pension designs, as well as the design of optimal reimbursement schemes for pharmaceuticals. He remained in this role from 2010 to 2016, before his appointment as President of the Hellenic Statistical Authority. In 2018, he became a visiting professor at the Aristotle University of Thessaloniki, lecturing in statistics and modelling within the mathematics department.

In his functions within the Greek government, Thanopoulos has been in charge of topics such as leading Greece's first digital population and housing census, implementing its first national statistical literacy strategy and spearheading the modernisation of the national statistical office, achieving full compliance with the European Statistics Code of Practice.

On 16 December 2025, he was appointed Deputy Director-General at ESTAT, the first time a Greek national has held such a senior role in the organisation.

His research has been published in international journals and focuses on behavioural public finance, dynamic stochastic general equilibrium models, social insurance design, public debt sustainability and quantitative analyses of taxation.

Thanopoulos speaks English and French alongside his native Greek.
