= Andreas Haitzer =

Austrian politician (born 1967)

Member of the National Council
- Incumbent
- Assumed office 24 October 2024
- Constituency: Salzburg

Member of the Salzburg Landtag
- In office 19 June 2013 – 17 March 2015
- Succeeded by: Gerd Brand
- Constituency: St. Johann im Pongau

Personal details
- Born: 25 December 1967 (age 58) Schwarzach im Pongau, Austria
- Party: Social Democratic Party

Andreas Haitzer (born 25 December 1967) is an Austrian politician and member of the National Council. A member of the Social Democratic Party, he has represented Salzburg since October 2024. He was a member of the Salzburg Landtag from June 2013 to March 2015.

Haitzer was born on 25 December 1967 in Schwarzach im Pongau. He was an apprentice industrial electrician at Tauernkraftwerke AG in Kaprun from 1983 to 1987. He was an electrical engineer at Elektro Florian/Fa Bleckmann from 1987 to 1993. He was a dispatcher and emergency co-ordinator for Austrian Federal Railways (ÖBB) from 1993 to 2011. He has held various positions in the Schwarzach im Pongau and Salzburg branches of the Social Democratic Party (SPÖ) since 2001. He has been a member of the municipal council in Schwarzach im Pongau since 2004 and has been mayor since 2008. He was elected to the Salzburg Landtag at the 2013 state election. He resigned from the Landtag in March 2015 and was replaced by Gerd Brand. He was elected to the National Council at the 2024 legislative election.

Electoral history of Andreas Haitzer
Election	Electoral district	Party	Votes	%	Result
2013 state	St. Johann im Pongau	Social Democratic Party	119	1.06%	Elected
2024 legislative	Lungau-Pinzgau-Pongau	Social Democratic Party	2,370	13.24%	Not elected
2024 legislative	Salzburg	Social Democratic Party	494	0.97%	Elected
