= Landtag =

German and Austrian state legislature

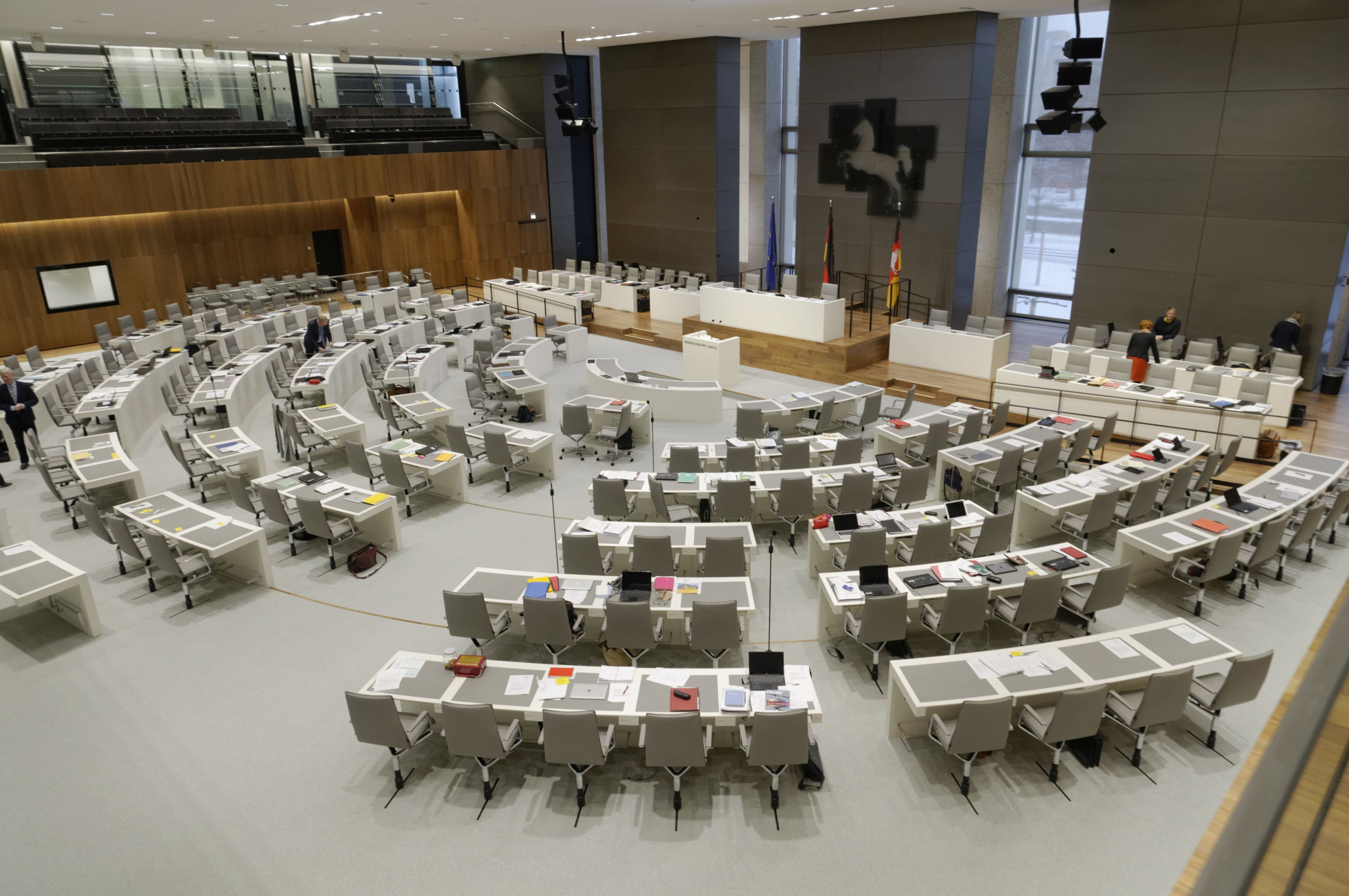
Floor of the Lower Saxony Landtag in Hanover in 2018

A Landtag (lit. 'State Diet') is generally the legislative assembly or parliament of a federated state or other subnational self-governing entity in German-speaking nations. It is usually a unicameral assembly exercising legislative competence in non-federal matters.

The States of Germany and Austria are governed by Landtage. In addition, the legislature of the Italian autonomous province of South Tyrol is known in German as a Landtag. Historically, states of the German Confederation also established Landtage. The Landtag of Liechtenstein is the nation's unicameral assembly.

== Name ==
The German word Landtag is composed of the words Land (state, country or territory) and Tag (day). The German word Tagung (meeting) is derived from the German word Tag, as such meetings were held at daylight and sometimes spanned several days.

== Historic Landtag assemblies ==
=== States of the Holy Roman Empire ===
In feudal society, the formal class system was reflected in the composition of the Imperial States' representative assemblies (Landstände), regardless of their name well described as estates of the realm: it was not intended as an elected reflection of public opinion, but a fixed expression of established power as recognized in formal privileges, including the right to be seated in person (granted to many nobles (knightage) and prelates, as well as certain cities) or to be represented as elector in a college that is entitled to one or more seats. Therefore, the representatives primarily defended class interests, and decisions were based on a class-based electoral system.

In some of the Imperial States that were known as Land, the name of such estates assembly was Landtag, analogous to the Reichstag (Imperial Diet), which mainly comprised most of the Princes of the Holy Roman Empire plus Reichsgrafen, Imperial prelates and Free imperial cities. The precise composition obviously varied greatly, and could change over time, as the result of privileges granted or lost, entities split or merged, border changes et cetera.

=== Prussia ===
Prussian Landtage were held:

- from 1466, in Royal Prussia. Before that, Prussian Landtag meetings were held in the Monastic state of the Teutonic Order. See also Prussian estates.
- from 1525, in Ducal Prussia.

See also Preußischer Landtag.

=== States of the German Confederation ===
As Austria and Prussia escaped the French 'exporting the revolution', and Napoleon was happy to maintain satellite monarchies in most German territories under his control (members of the Confederation of the Rhine), the more democratic principles of the Enlightenment would have less effect in the German-speaking lands, or only much later.

In 1815 the German Confederation ("Deutscher Bund") was founded as successor to the Holy Roman Empire. § 13 of the "Bundesakte" (the constitution of the German Confederation) forced the German states to pass constitutions and implement parliaments called Landstände or Landtage.

The first constitution was passed in Nassau in 1814. Until 1841 (Luxembourg) all but two states got their constitution and parliaments.

=== States of the German Empire ===
In 1871 the German Empire was founded. All 25 states of the German Empire and Alsace-Lorraine (the "Reichsland Elsaß-Lothringen") (from 1911) had Landtage as legislative authorities. The most important one was the Prussian Landtag.

=== States of the Weimar Republic ===
In the Weimar Republic (1919 – 1933) all of the states of the republic had Landtage that were democratically elected by universal suffrage, and to which the state governments were responsible. After the Nazi seizure of power, they embarked on the process of Gleichschaltung (coordination). On 31 March 1933, the Provisional Law on the Coordination of the States with the Reich was enacted, which dissolved all the sitting Landtage and reconstituted them on the basis of the recent Reichstag election results, which had given the Nazi Party and its coalition partner the DNVP a working majority. This was followed by the "Law on the Reconstruction of the Reich" of 30 January 1934 that formally abolished all the Landtage and transferred the sovereignty of the states to the central government. Although the states themselves continued in existence, the federalism of the Republic was effectively supplanted by a unitary state.

=== East Germany ===
Under its original constitution, East Germany was a federal republic with five Länder, each with its own Landtag. Each Landtag was responsible for electing the Chamber of States, the upper house of the national parliament.

In 1952, the Länder were dissolved and replaced by Bezirke (districts). The Landtage were accordingly abolished and their functions transferred to the Bezirke governments. The Länder were eventually restored after the Peaceful Revolution, but their Landtage did not convene until after the reunification of Germany.

=== Finland ===
The Diet of Finland, which was created when the country was ceded from Sweden to Russia in 1809, was called lantdag in Swedish until 1906 when it was replaced by the unicameral Parliament of Finland. Parliament continued using the name lantdag in Swedish until 1919, when Finland adopted its first constitution following the declaration of independence in 1917. Since then, the official term in Swedish has been riksdag, equivalent of the German Reichstag. The Finnish name is eduskunta.

=== Baltic countries ===
The first Landtag of the Livonian Confederation was called by archbishop of Riga Johannes Ambundii in 1419 and reconvened on a regular basis until the incorporation of Livonian lands into the Grand Duchy of Lithuania, Sweden and Denmark in 1561. Separate Landtags for Livonia, Courland and Estonia continued to exist as bodies of the Duchies of Livonia, Estonia, Courland and Semigallia, and later the Russian Governorates of Livonia, Estonia and Courland. After the independence of Estonia and Latvia in 1918, they were ultimately replaced by the Riigikogu and the Saeima.

== Modern legislatures ==
In the contemporary Federal Republic of Germany, the Republic of Austria and the Italian Republic's province of South Tyrol (with a German-speaking majority), a Landtag is a unicameral legislature for a constitutive federal state (Bundesland). In the Principality of Liechtenstein, the Landtag is the sole national parliament, because Liechtenstein has no federal structure due to its size.

=== German legislatures ===
In most of the German constitutive federal states (Bundesländer), the unicameral legislature is called Landtag:

- Landtag of Baden-Württemberg
- Landtag of Bavaria (until 1999, the large federal state of Bavaria was the only state with a bicameral legislature, with a lower house called the Landtag, and an upper house called the Senate)
- Landtag of Brandenburg
- Landtag of Hesse
- Landtag of Mecklenburg-Vorpommern
- Landtag of Lower Saxony
- Landtag of North Rhine-Westphalia
- Landtag of Rhineland-Palatinate
- Landtag of Saarland
- Landtag of Saxony
- Landtag of Saxony-Anhalt
- Landtag of Schleswig-Holstein
- Landtag of Thuringia

In the German city-states, the parliamentary city council serves the function of the state parliament within the federal system - in the Free Hanseatic City of Bremen and in the Free and Hanseatic City of Hamburg it is called the Bürgerschaft (municipal assembly):

- Bürgerschaft of Bremen
- Bürgerschaft of Hamburg

In the German capital and city state of Berlin, the legislature since 1951 (then of West Berlin) is called Abgeordnetenhaus ("House of Representatives"), adopting the tradition of the Prussian Landtag.

The national bicameral Parliament comprises the directly elected Bundestag and the Bundesrat which represents the state governments in Federal matters which affect the Länder.

=== Austrian legislatures ===
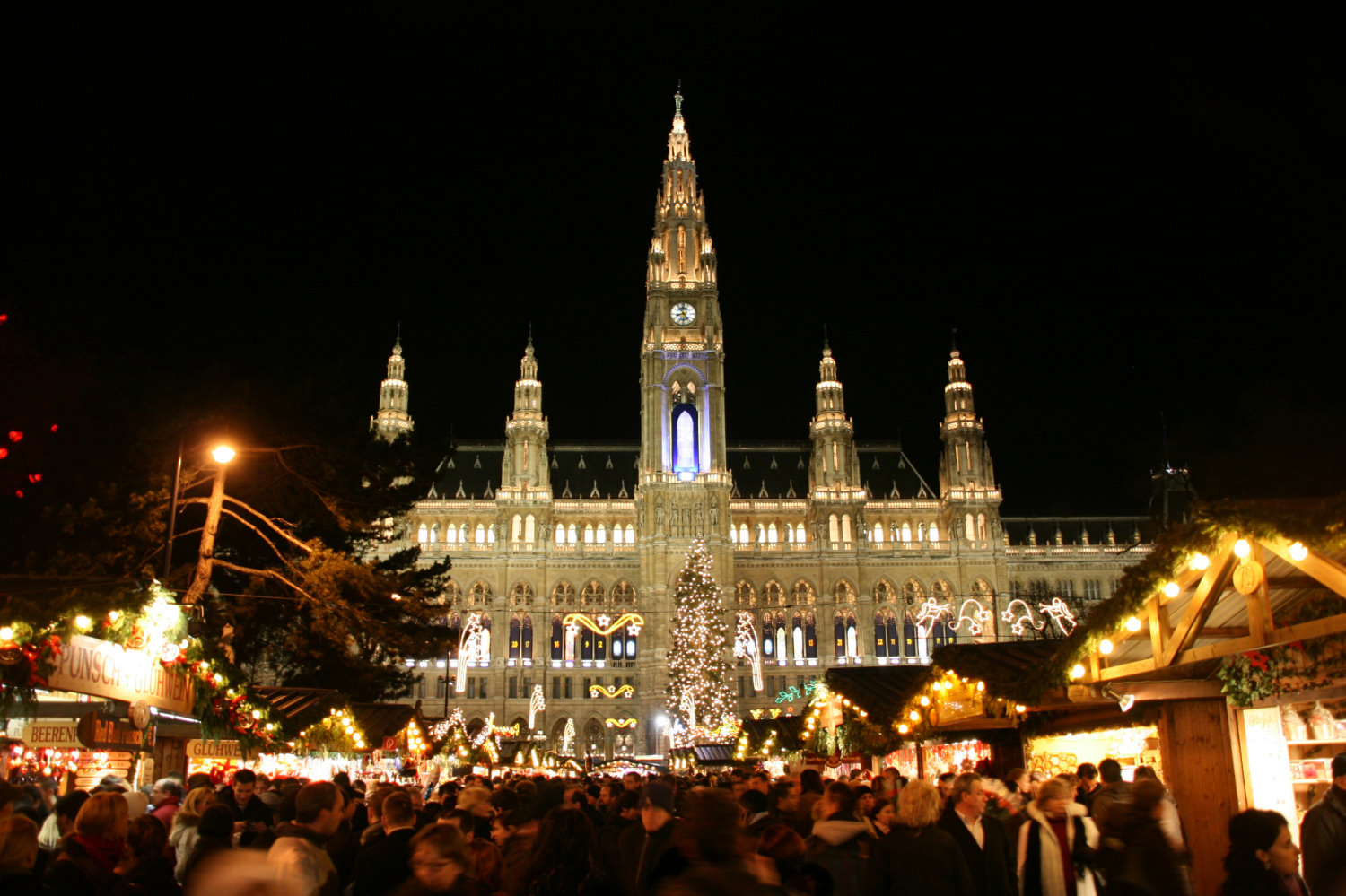
Rathaus, Vienna, serves as City Hall and Gemeinderat.

According to the Constitution of Austria, the Landtage are the unicameral legislatures of the nine states of Austria (Bundesländer), dealing with all matters not explicitly allotted to federal level:

- Landtag of Burgenland
- Landtag of Carinthia
- Landtag of Lower Austria
- Landtag of Upper Austria
- Landtag of Salzburg
- Landtag of Styria
- Landtag of Tyrol
- Landtag of Vorarlberg

As the Austrian capital Vienna (like Berlin) is both a city-state and a municipality, the Gemeinderat (municipal assembly) of Vienna also serves as the state Landtag. However, the city constitution states that municipal and state affairs are kept separate, and the two bodies hold separate meetings even though their memberships are identical.

The representatives are elected in general, free, secret and direct ballots according to the principle of proportional representation. The largest of the parliamentary groups (called Klubs in Austria) usually nominates the Landeshauptmann governor. The modern Landtage are the democratic successors of the estates assemblies in the corresponding crown lands of the Austrian Empire. Exceptions are the city of Vienna, which belonged to the Lower Austria Kronland until 1920, and Burgenland, ceded to Austria by the Kingdom of Hungary in 1921.

Austria's national bicameral parliament consists of the directly elected National Council and the Federal Council, which represents the Landtage parliaments at the federal level. The two chambers meet in the Federal Assembly, held for the ceremonial swearing-in of the Austrian president.

== Sources and references ==
- Donaumonarchie (in German)

== See also ==
- The Estates
- Diet (assembly)
- Composition of the German State Parliaments
