= Hellenic Statistical Authority =

National statistical service of Greece

- Ελληνική Στατιστική Αρχή
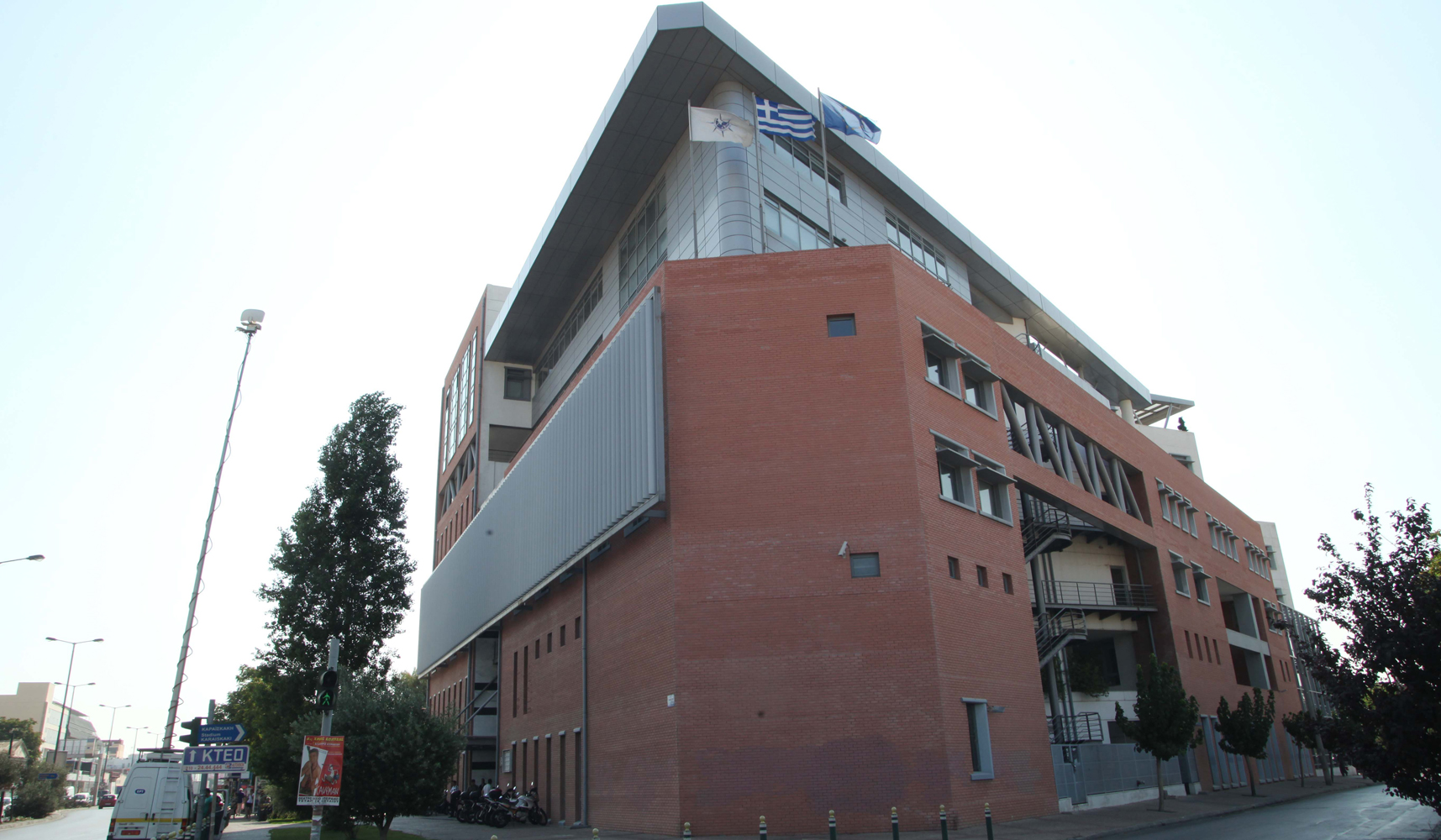
- ELSTAT headquarters

Agency overview
- Formed: 1956 (as ESYE); 1986 (as G.G. ESYE); 2010 (as ELSTAT)
- Headquarters: 46 Pireos and Eponiton street, 18510, Piraeus, Greece
- Employees: 625
- Agency executive: Athanassios Katsis, President
- Website: statistics.gr

The Hellenic Statistical Authority (Greek: Ελληνική Στατιστική Αρχή IPA: [eliniˈci statistiˈci arˈçi]), known by its acronym ELSTAT (Greek: ΕΛ.ΣΤΑΤ), is the national statistical service of Greece.

The purpose of ELSTAT is to produce, on a regular basis, official statistics, as well as to conduct statistical surveys which:

- cover all the fields of activity of the public and private sector,
- underpin the processes for decision making, policy drawing and evaluating the policies of the Government and the public administrations and services (evaluation indicators),
- are submitted to international agencies in compliance with the obligations of the country and
- concern the general public or specific categories of users of statistics in Greece and abroad

In accordance with its establishing law, ELSTAT is an independent authority and it is not subject to the control of any governmental bodies or other administrative authority. Its operation is subject to the control of the Hellenic Parliament.

== History ==
The agency was originally established as the National Statistical Service of Greece (Εθνική Στατιστική Υπηρεσία Ελλάδος) in 1956 by Legislative Decree 3627/1956. In 1986, Presidential Decree 224/1986 it was transformed into the General Secretariat of the National Statistical Service of Greece and became part of the Ministry of National Economy. Law 2392/1996 provided for the arrangement of issues concerning the access of the General Secretariat of the National Statistical Service of Greece to administrative sources and files, as well as statistical confidentiality issues.

On 20 October 2009, the new finance minister in the newly elected Cabinet of George Papandreou announced that Greece's budget deficit was expected to reach ~12.5% of GDP. On 8 January 2010, the European Commission published its report 'Report on Greek government deficit and debt statistics'.

On 23 April 2010 Prime Minister George Papandreou formally requested an international bailout for Greece. The European Union (EU), European Central Bank (ECB) and International Monetary Fund (IMF) agreed to participate in the bailout. On 2 May 2010, the IMF, Papandreou, and other Eurozone PMs agreed to the first bailout package for €110 billion ($143 billion) over 3 years. The third austerity package was announced by the Greek government.

As recommended by Eurostat, ESYE was dissolved and replaced by ELSTAT in July 2010 via Law 3832/2010 (amended since by Laws 3842/2010, 3899/2010, 3943/2011, 3965/2011, 4047/2012 and 4072/2012).

== Overview ==
The Hellenic Statistical Authority collects data pertaining to the population (it is responsible for the conduct of the population census, every 10 years), health and social security, employment and unemployment, education, etc. The statistical data collected by ELSTAT are used by both the Greek State and international organisations (such as UNESCO, the UN, OECD), by enterprises, the scientific community, citizens and others.

ELSTAT employs 625 people working in the central office and in 50 Regional Statistical Offices located in various regions of Greece. The registered office of ELSTAT is in the Municipality of Piraeus.

== Management ==
Professor Athanassios Katsis assumed his duties as President of the Hellenic Statistical Authority (ELSTAT), following a decision of the Greek Minister of Economy and Finance, in May 2026. His appointment as President of the Hellenic Statistical Authority was recommended by the ad hoc international Committee of Experts.

Athanasios C. Thanopoulos served as President of ELSTAT from February 2016 to December 2025. He was unanimously nominated for the position by an international Committee of Experts and assumed office following a relevant decision by the Minister of Finance.

== List of service presidents ==
National Statistical Service of Greece (ESYE)

Term of Office	Full Name	Comments
1956-1970	Petros Kouvelis	
1970-1972	Stylianos Geronymakis	
1972-1977	Dimitrios Athanasopoulos	
1977-1982	Christos Kerperis	
1982-1984	Evangelos Kalampokidis	
1984-1986	Grigoris Kasimatis	

General Secretariat of ESYE

Term of Office	Full Name	Comments
1986-1989	Nikolaos Zachariadis	
1989	Dimitrios Kollias	for 2 months
1989-1990	Georgios Sykianakis	
1990-1993	Εmmanouil Kontopyrakis	
1993-1997	Theofani Zervou	
1997-2004	Nikolaos Karavitis	
2004-2009	Εmmanouil Kontopyrakis	

Hellenic Statistical Authority (ELSTAT)

Term of Office	Full Name	Comments
2010-2015	Andreas Georgiou	
2016-2025	Athanasios Thanopoulos	
2025-2026	Nikolaos Stromplos	Acting President - Head of the Directorate General for Statistics
2026-...	Athanassios Katsis	President

== Statistics ==
ELSTAT announces the results of its statistical surveys, in the Greek and English language, in various publications. Among these publications are:

- Greek Economy which presents the latest key economic information on Greece.
- Living Conditions in Greece which is designed for users of statistics who seek updated information on recent social developments, as well as long-term social trends.
- Greece in figures which presents statistical data providing an updated demographic, social and economic picture of Greece in a clear and comprehensive manner.
- Sustainable Development Goals 2030 which presents the most recent statistical data for Greece with regard to the Sustainable Development indicators, which are compiled primarily by the Hellenic Statistical Authority (ELSTAT) within the framework of the United Nations 2030 Agenda.

== Responsibilities ==
In accordance with article 11 of Law 3832/2010, as in force, ELSTAT has the following responsibilities:

1. It establishes and implements the annual statistical programme, produces and disseminates as the “National Statistical Institute”, in compliance to paragraph 1 of article 5 of Regulation (EC) No 223/2009, the official, national and European Statistics of the country, and conducts any kind of regular or ad hoc statistical surveys, censuses and studies.
2. It represents Greece as the “National Statistical Institute” in accordance with paragraph 1 of article 5 of the Regulation (EC) No 223/2009 in the services of the European Union and in any other competent international organisation.
3. It cooperates with the European Statistical Office – Eurostat and the other services of the European Commission, the National Statistical Institutes of the other Member States and the national authorities defined in the next paragraph, and with other international agencies and organisations on statistical issues and participates in the relevant statistical committees of the European Union and of other international organisations as the “National Statistical Institute”.
4. It sees to the timely, reliable and effective dissemination of statistical information and to the promotion of statistical issues and economic research in the context of the country’s international cooperation.
5. It cooperates with public and private agencies in Greece or abroad, such as educational institutions, research centers and non-profit organisations for the promotion of scientific research for statistical issues, the harmonization of methodology and the implementation of the statistical principles of the Hellenic and European Statistical Systems.
6. It cooperates and consults with all the other agencies of EL.S.S. on the development of methods and systems for statistical purposes in their domains of responsibility.
7. It develops, disseminates and coordinates the implementation of the European Statistics Code of Practice within the frame of EL.S.S. More specifically, it provides consultancy services concerning methodology issues and statistical tools to all other agencies of EL.S.S. and to any other public or private agency and undertakes statistical work on behalf of third parties, public or private agencies in compliance with community and international principles and practices so as a mutually accepted methodology is disseminated and implemented.
8. It teaches its staff and that of other EL.S.S. agencies to acknowledge the principles and methods of production of reliable statistics for the European Statistical System.
9. It sees to the continuous upgrading of the human resources available to EL.STAT. through training and seminars.
