= Andreas Roth (painter) =

German Painter

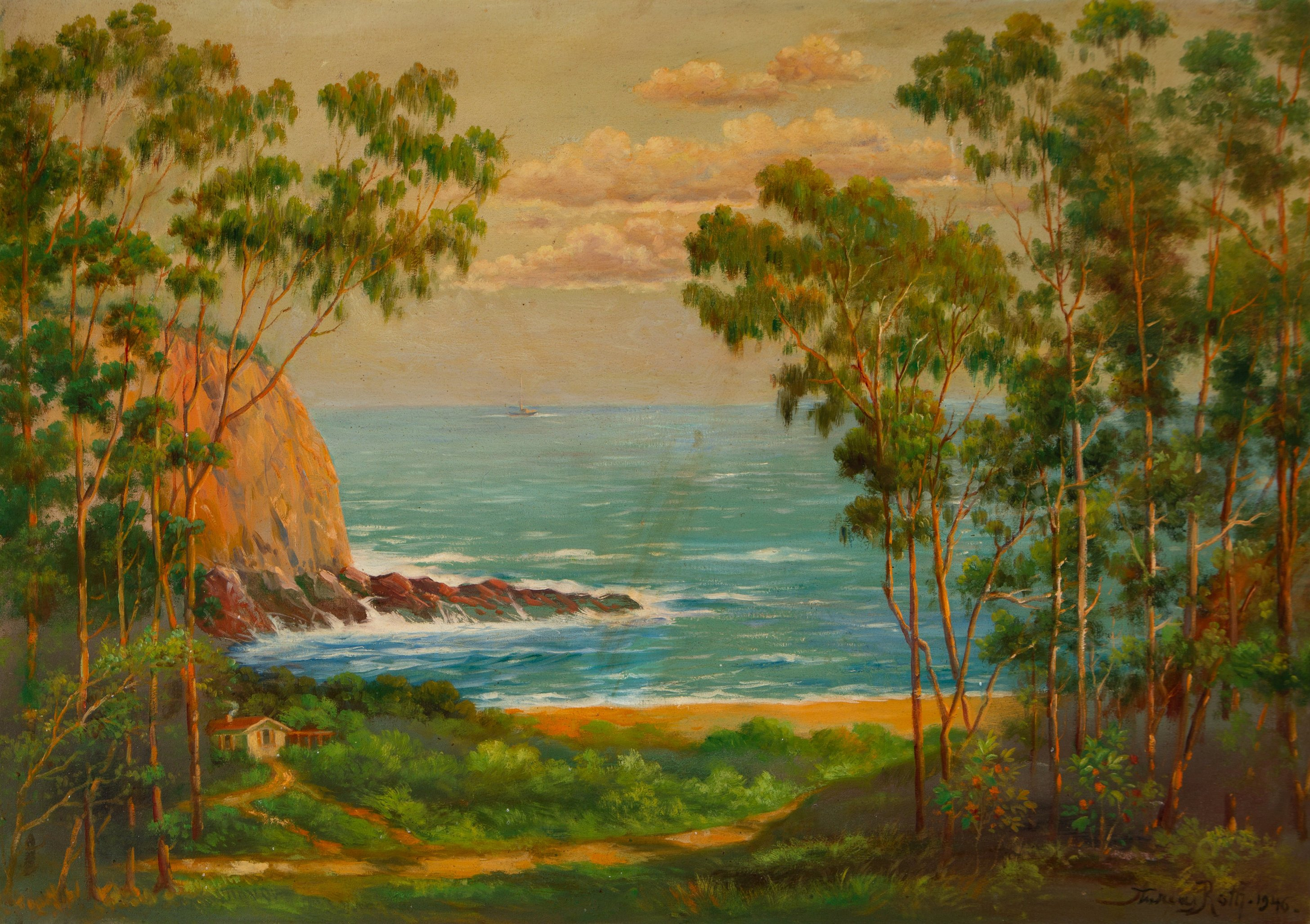
Emerald Bay, Laguna Beach, California, by Andreas Roth

Andreas Roth (Kleinochsenfurt 1, November 1871 – Los Angeles, 5 December 1949) was a German painter.

== Biography ==
Son of the sharecropper Johannes Roth (1835–1904) and Anna Maria Ullrich (1842–1910), Roth was educated in a peasant family of Catholic religion. In November 1897, at the age of twenty-six, he moved to Munich where he studied at the Academy of Art with Professor Gysis. At the academy he met Amalia Liepold (the daughter of one of his teachers) and their son Albin was born from their relationship in 1898.

The relationship with his family had been tense for some years and the painter had moved away from home towards the age of twenty. A few years before entering the Academy, as is clear from his father's letters, it is not known where he studied before and how he supported himself.

Roth constantly travelled around locations in Europe, including: Switzerland, Austria, and northern Italy, painting mainly natural and urban landscapes.

He married Mathilde Speckbacher (1884–1958) and his son Hermann was born in Riva del Garda on June 25, 1912. In Riva del Garda. In 1917 he officially resumed his residence in his hometown near Kleinochsenfurth.

On 10 January 1931, his son Hermann died of pneumonia and shortly thereafter, the now sixty-year-old painter Andreas Roth decided, with a twist, to move to the United States, to Los Angeles. Here, thanks to his sociable nature, he manages to have some success painting portraits, flowers and landscapes. He settles at the King Edwards Hotel in Los Angeles, hence perhaps the nickname Edward Andreas by which he is often known in America. He worked for two years for an American public defence office (defence ministry); therefore the mystery of this German artist who moved to America before the rise of Hitler for reasons still partly obscure, deepens even more.

In 1937 he began a series of trips to Canada on Lake Louise where he rediscovered the snowy and glacial landscapes he had painted in Europe in his youth. He died of lung cancer on December 5, 1949 in Los Angeles.

His inheritance including some paintings and thirty letters without envelopes (letters from Andreas Roth's father to his son were found between 1892 and 1894 and twenty-four letters written to his son Albin between 1947 and 1949 when he resided in the United States United) will be delivered to relatives in Germany and divided into five parts. Much has been lost and only recently the great-grandson Andreas Leipold is trying to organize the biography of his great-grandfather.

== Works ==
=== The Dolomites of Brenta in two paintings – 1905 ===
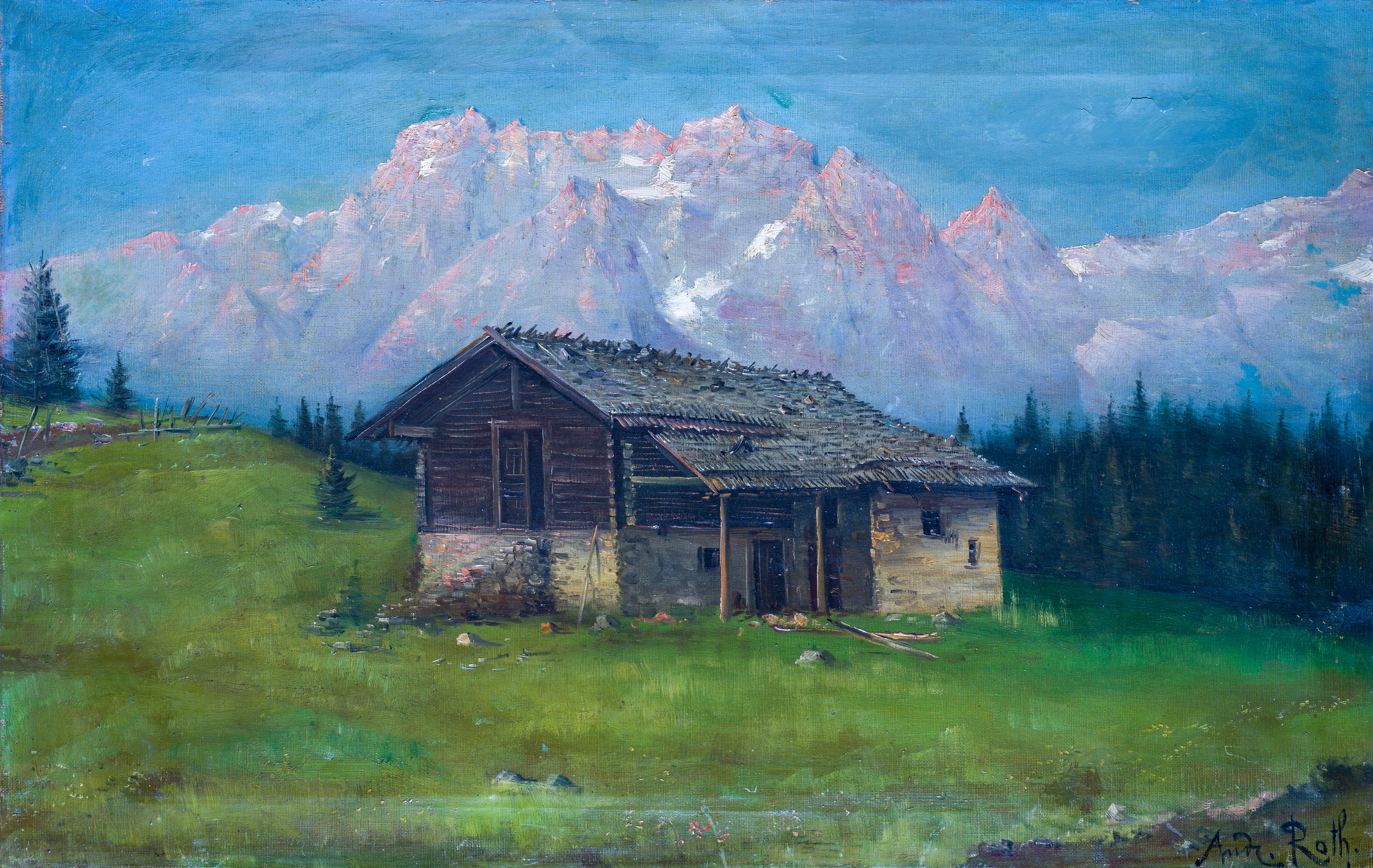

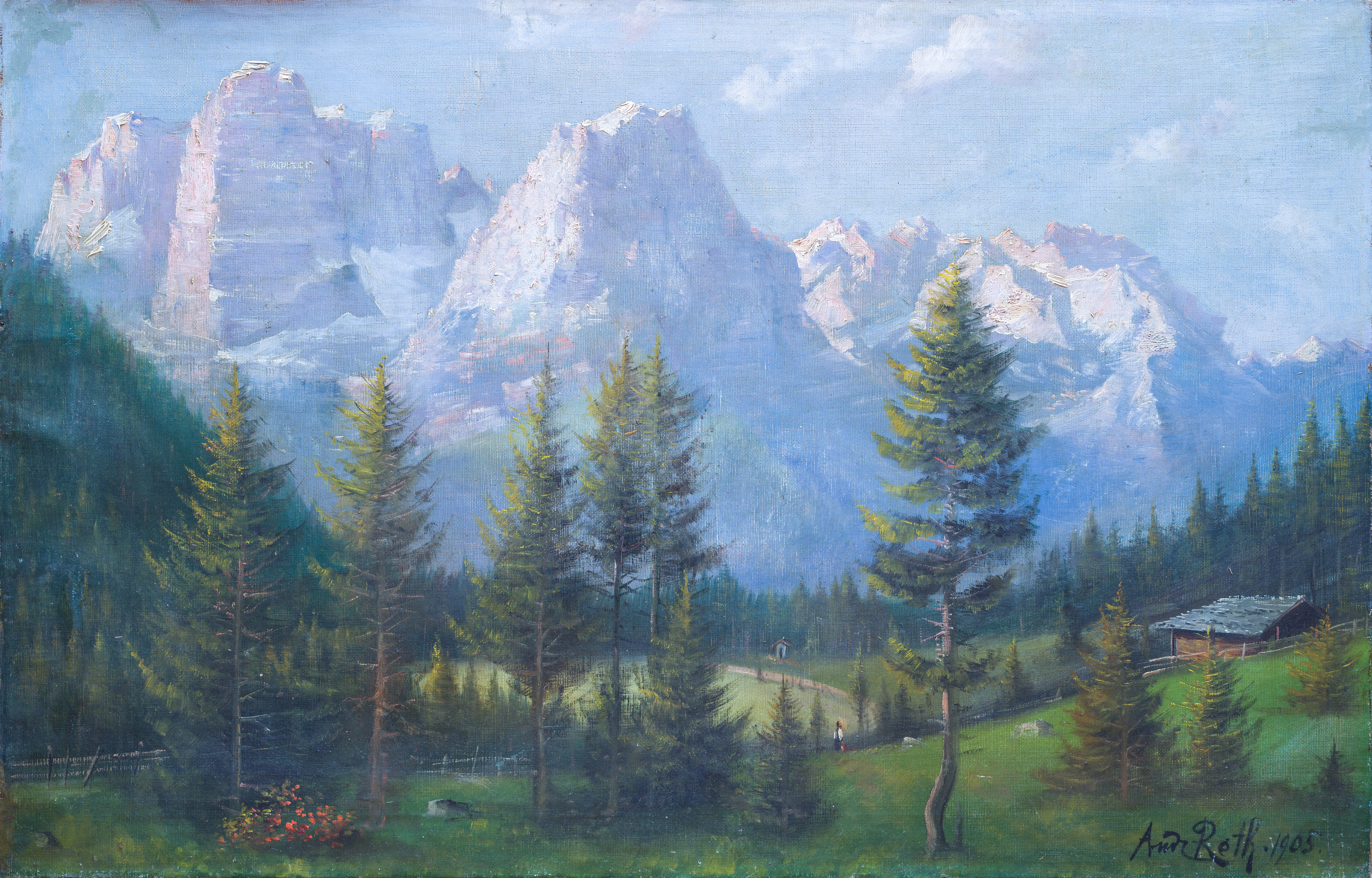

Andreas Roth is part of the post-impressionist painting typical of his period of learning, he was strongly attracted by natural landscapes but he was also able to interpret the urban landscape at least in his European phase. Salzburg, Innsbruck, Bolzano, Riva and Torbole sul Garda: an all-round director that the artist will cover in his works both in its urban and natural aspect.

Many of his paintings were the subject of a series of postcards for the Austrian publisher Ferd Morawetz of Salzburg. However, he himself was an independent publisher (Verlag Andreas Roth Riva am Gardasee) of a series of postcards that portrayed pictures of the places he painted in the upper Garda Trentino.
