= Andreas Hanna-Krahl =

German politician (born 1989)

Member of the Landtag of Bavaria
- Incumbent
- Assumed office 5 November 2018
- Constituency: Upper Bavaria

Personal details
- Born: 10 June 1989 (age 37)
- Party: Alliance 90/The Greens (since 2013)

Andreas Hanna-Krahl (born 10 June 1989) is a German politician serving as a member of the Landtag of Bavaria since 2018. He has served as vice president of the Bavarian Red Cross since 2021.
