= Andreas Hyperius =

Protestant theologian and reformer (1511-1564)

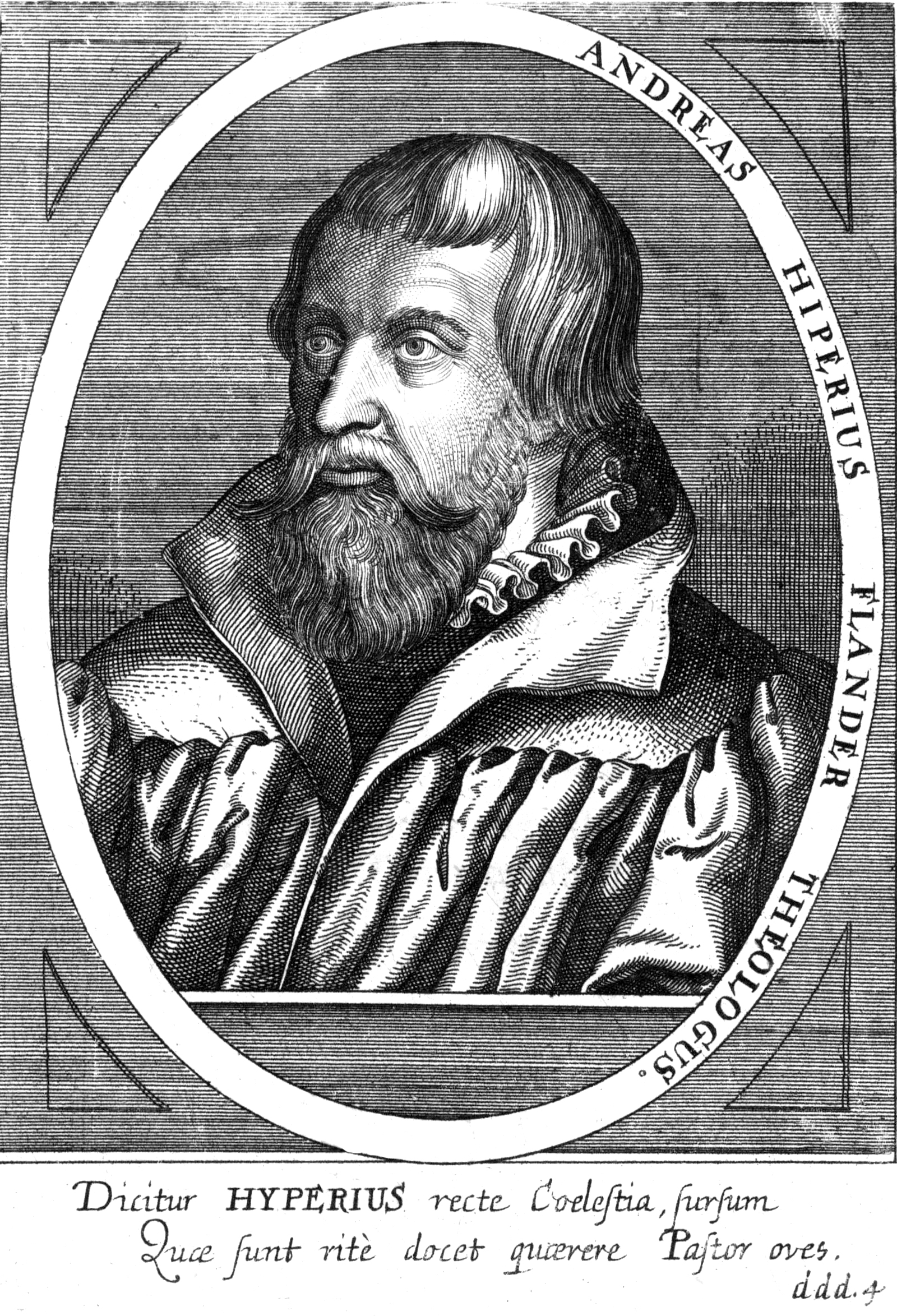
Andreas Hyperius

Andreas Gerhard Hyperius (1511–1564), real name Andreas Gheeraerdts, was a Protestant theologian and Protestant reformer. He was Flemish, born at Ypres, which is signified by the name 'Hyperius'.

== Life ==
He had a humanist education, and studied at Tournai and Paris. He was resident in England from 1536 to 1540, and in 1542 was appointed professor of theology at Marburg.

== Work ==
Hyperius's theology lies between Lutheran and Reformed beliefs. Influenced by Martin Bucer, he was not a strict Lutheran. Jean Calvin endorsed his erudition. His work De formandis concionibus sacris (On the Making of Sacred Discourses) was the first Protestant text solely devoted to systematic homiletics, that is, to preaching considered as a branch of rhetoric. The Methodus theologiae is a selection from, and method for reading, the Church Fathers.

In his overall approach, Hyperius sought a firm basis in the Bible, rigidly, and held that before practical theology can be put in force, it must be made a part of systematic theological study, and must not be taught fragmentarily. Demanding an immense amount of preliminary reading on the part of the student, covering all practical theology except missions, he held that such reading would involve preparation for the practical work of the ministry. All must be squared with the Bible, or, where the Bible did not contain specific data, with the commandments of love for God and one's neighbor.

In addition, he urged the preparation of a work on church government, including the data of the New Testament, relevant portions of church history, excerpts from the councils, papal decrees, Church Fathers, and works on dogmatics, liturgics, and related materials.

His English translator, John Ludham (vicar of Wethersfield, Essex, 1570–1613), published the De formandis as The Practise of Preaching, otherwise called the Pathway to the Pulpet (London 1577). Ludham went on to translate Hyperius's posthumously published De Sacrae Scripturae lectione ac meditatione quotidiana (Basle, 1569) as The Course of Christianity: or, as touching the dayly reading and meditation of the holy Scriptures (London 1579): he then turned to the homilies of Rudolf Gwalther on the prophet Joel (London 1582) before returning to Hyperius for A Speciall Treatise of Gods Providence (c. 1588), which included an exposition upon Psalm 107. To this was added an appendix of the Cambridge sermons and disquisitions of Peter Baro.

Dietrich Bonhoeffer emphasised the role Hyperius had played in early Protestantism.

== Works ==
- De formandis concionibus sacris (1553, enlarged 1562)
- De theologo, seu de ratione studii theologici, libri IIII (1556)
- Elementa christianae religionis (1563)
- Methodi theologiae, sive praecipuorum christianae religionis locorum conmunium, libri tres (1568).
- De Sacrae Scripturae lectione ac meditatione quotidiana (1579).
