= Andreas Georgiou (politician) =

Cypriot politician (1953–2021)

Member of the House of Representatives
- In office 4 June 1987 – 5 June 1996
- Constituency: Larnaca District

Personal details
- Born: May 1953; Larnaca, Cyprus
- Died: 20 November 2021 (aged 68)
- Political party: Democratic Rally
- Profession: Lawyer

Andreas Afxentiou Georgiou (May 1953 – 20 November 2021) was a Cypriot politician and lawyer. He served in the House of Representatives from 4 June 1987 to 5 June 1996. He was a member of the Democratic Rally.

== Early life ==
Georgiou was born in Larnaca, Cyprus, in May 1953. He spoke both Greek and English. His brother, Georgios Georgiou, served as an MP from 1981 to 1984.

== Career ==
Georgiou ran for congress for the Larnaca District in 1985, but was not elected. After the incumbent, Georgios Tzirkotis, died in 1987, Georgiou was appointed MP for the district. He was re-elected in 1991. As an MP, he was Deputy Chairman of the Parliamentary Committee on Finance and Budget and a member of the Parliamentary Committees on Legal Affairs, Trade and Industry, Defense and Members' Regulations and Rights. His term ended in 1996. In 1997 he was appointed Vice President of the Cyprus Tourism Organization, a position he held until 2000. He was the founder and CEO of a law firm called A.A. Georgiou D.E.P.E. He died on 20 November 2021 and was buried at Aradippou Cemetery.
