= Landtag of Salzburg =

State parliament of Salzburg, Austria

Salzburg State Diet Salzburger Landtag

Type
- Type: Landtag

History
- Founded: 1861; 1920

Leadership
- President of the Landtag: Brigitta Pallauf, ÖVP

Structure
- Seats: 36
- Political groups: Government (22): ÖVP (12); FPÖ (10); Opposition (14): SPÖ (7); KPÖ Plus (4); GRÜNE (3)
- Length of term: 5 years

Elections
- Last election: 23 April 2023
- Next election: 2028

Meeting place
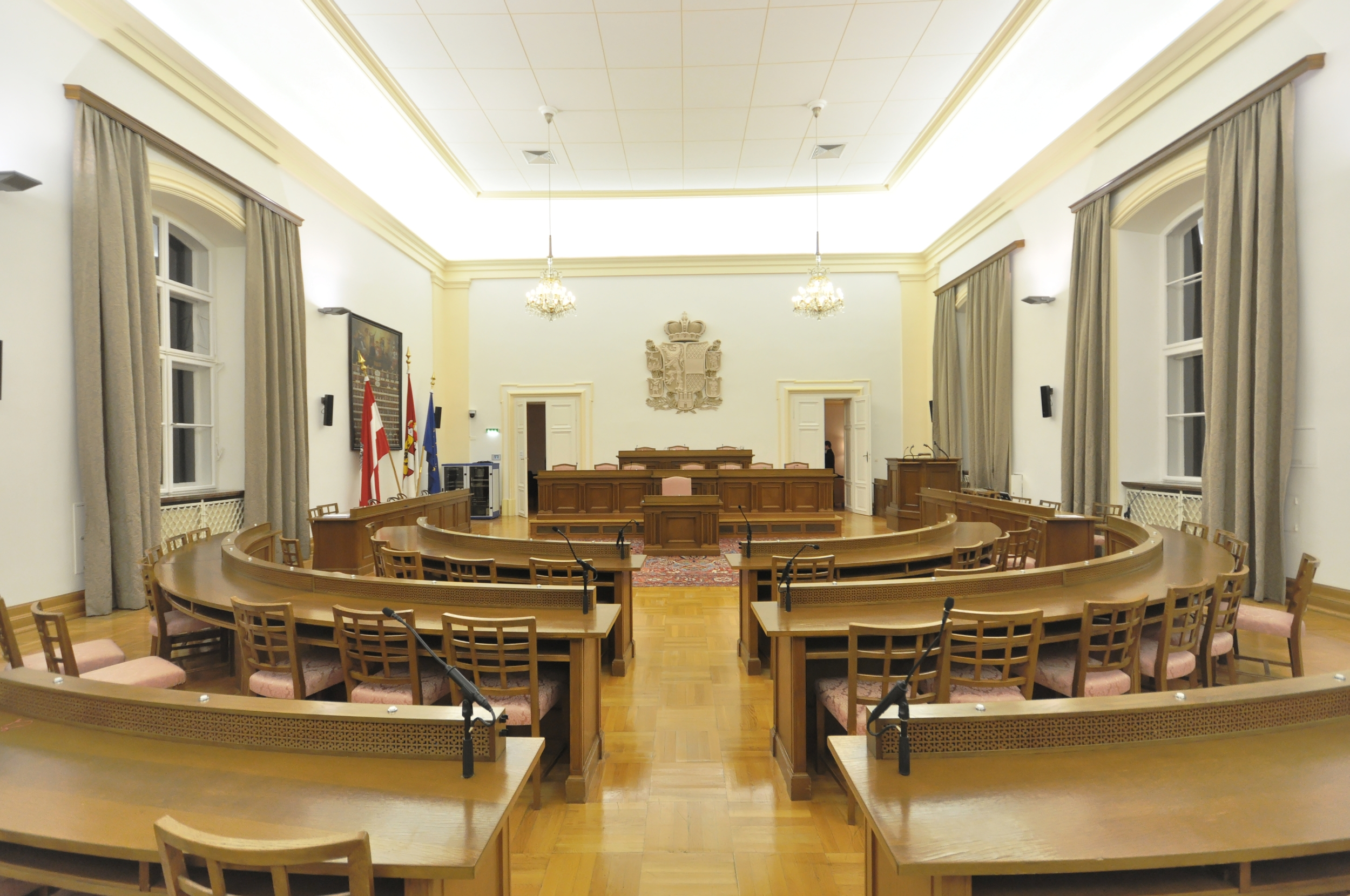
- Salzburg, Salzburg

The Salzburg Landtag is the 36-member elected body of the province of Salzburg, Austria.
