= Önder Çengel =

Turkish-Swiss footballer (born 1982)

Personal information
- Date of birth: 21 July 1982 (age 44)
- Place of birth: Kahramanmaraş, Turkey-
- Height: 1.76 m (5 ft 9 in)
- Position: Striker

Youth career
- 2001–2002: Grasshoppers

Senior career*
Years	Team	Apps	(Gls)
2002–2003	→ FC Baden (loan)	6	(1)
2003	→ Yverdon-Sport (loan)		
2003–2004	→ FC Winterthur (loan)	14	(7)
2004	Grasshoppers	3	(1)
2005–2006	Diyarbakırspor	0	(0)
2005–2006	→ FC Wil (loan)	13	(11)
2006	→ FC Thun (loan)	15	(5)
2006	Gaziantepspor	3	(0)
2007–2008	FC Winterthur	26	(14)
2008–2009	Karşıyaka	16	(1)
2009–2010	FC Schaffhausen	7	(0)
2010	Chiasso		
2010–2011	Diyarbakırspor	11	(1)
2011–2012	Kartalspor	30	(9)
2012	Elazığspor	5	(0)
2012–2013	Şanlıurfaspor	5	(0)
2013–2014	Pendikspor	5	(0)
2014	Eyüpspor	7	(1)
Total		166	(51)

International career
2003	Switzerland U21	1	(0)
- * Club domestic league appearances and goals

Önder Çengel (born 21 July 1982) is a Turkish-Swiss former professional footballer who played as a striker.

At the start of the 2004–05 season, Turkish champion Fenerbahçe tried Önder and Gökhan Inler in the season start training camp in Germany, but coach Christoph Daum declared that both players could not play for Fenerbahçe.

Although wearing shirt no.7, he made only two unused substitute appearances for Diyarbakırspor.pril 2005.

He signed a three-year contract with Gaziantepspor in summer 2007. On 15 February 2007, he signed for FC Winterthur. He is transfer to Karşıyaka in 2008.
