= Andreas (physicians) =

Andreas (Ancient Greek: Ἀνδρέας) was the name of several physicians in ancient Greece, whom it is difficult to distinguish from each other.

Andreas Comes, quoted several times by Aëtius of Amida was certainly the latest of all, whose title "Comes" here meant "Comes archiatrorum". He probably lived shortly before Aetius himself (that is, in the fourth or fifth century AD), as this title was only introduced under the Roman emperors.

If, for want of any positive data, all the other passages where the name Andreas occurs are supposed to refer to the same person (which may be the case), he was a native of Carystus in Euboea, the son of a man named Chrysar or Chrysaor (ὁ τοῦ Χρύσαρος or Χρυσάορος), if the name is not corrupt, and one of the followers of Herophilos.

The earliest known Andreas was physician to Ptolemy IV Philopator, and was killed while in attendance on that prince, shortly before the Battle of Raphia (217 BCE), by Theodotus of Aetolia, who had secretly entered the tent with the intent to murder the king. He wrote several medical works, of which nothing remains but the titles, and a few extracts preserved by different ancient authors. He may be the first person to write a treatise on rabies, which he called Κυνόλυσσος (Kunolyssos). In one of his works On Medical Genealogy, he is said by Soranus, in his life of Hippocrates, to have given a false and scandalous account of that great physician, saying that he had been obliged to leave his native country on account of his having set fire to the library at Cnidos; a story which, though universally considered to be totally unfounded, was repeated with some variations by Varro and John Tzetzes, and was much embellished in the middle ages.

Eratosthenes is said to have accused Andreas of plagiarism, and to have called him "the Aegisthius (or Adulterer) of Books".

The name occurs in several ancient authors, but no other facts are related of .
