= Andreas Georgiou Thomas =

Cypriot poet

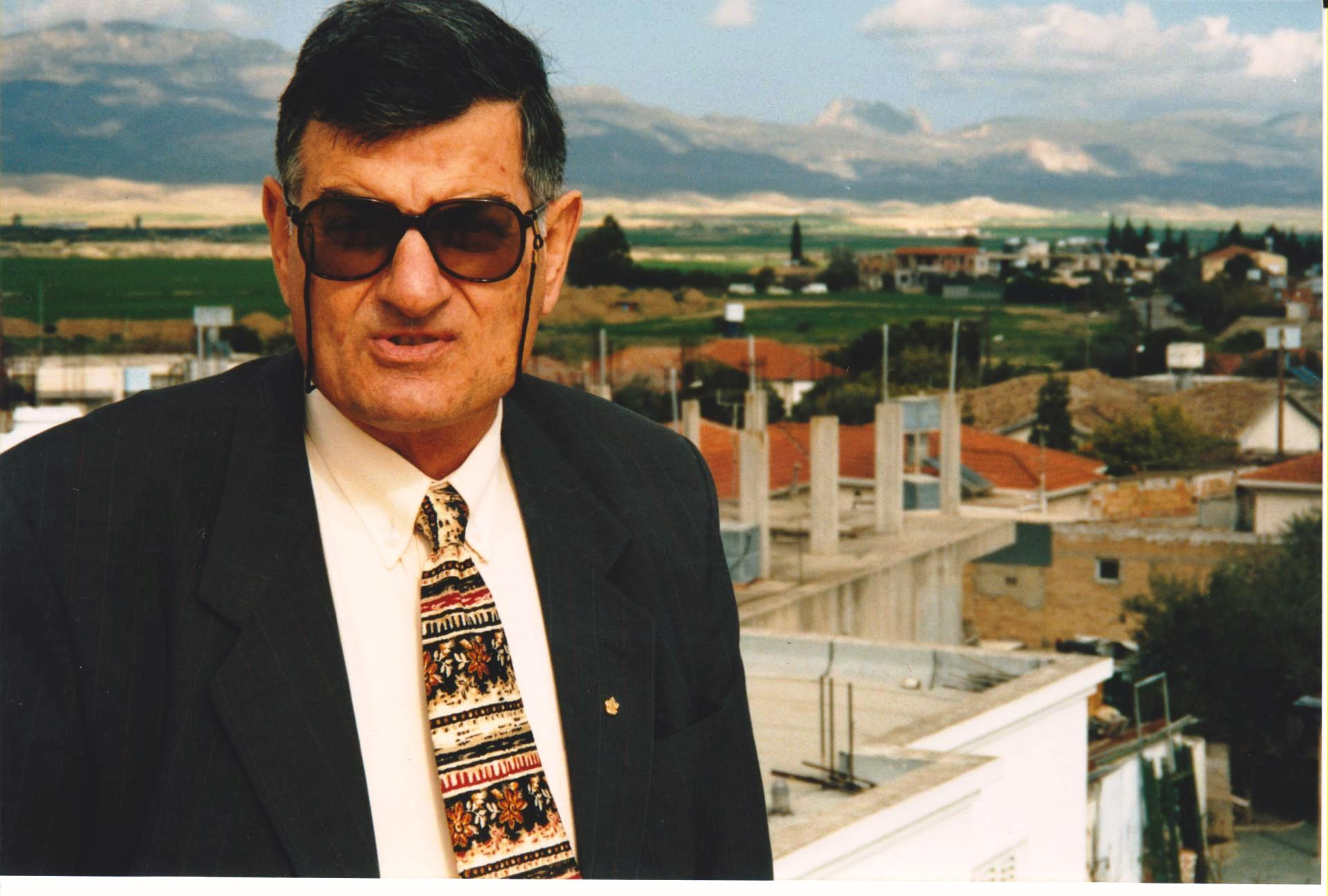
- Andreas G. Thomas on the rooftop of a house in Keramikou St, Vorios Polos, Kaimaklin, Nicosia, Cyprus, February 1999. In the background is Pentadactylos. Photograph: C. Moisa
- Born: 1942; Varosha, Famagusta, Cyprus
- Died: 2002 (aged 59–60); Nicosia Cyprus
- Education: Famagusta Gymnasium
- Alma mater: London University
- Occupations: poet, essayist and educationalist
- Parent(s): Georgios Thomas & Chrystalleni Kelocostantinou

Andreas Georgiou Thomas (1942–2002) was a Cypriot poet and educationalist, who during his lifetime made a significant contribution to modern Cypriot literature and secondary education.

== Early life ==
Thomas was born in Varoshia, a provincial city of the district of Famagusta on the east coast of Cyprus, in 1942. His father was Georgios Thomas and his mother was Chrystalleni Kelocostantinou who were both from Varoshia. He had four siblings, one brother and three sisters. Thomas died in Nicosia in 2002. He is survived by his wife, Niki, and two daughters.

== Education ==
Thomas was educated at the Gymnasium of Famagusts, and the University of Athens(1954–1960), where he gained a Bachelor of Arts in Greek Literature (1967). He also gained a Diploma of Education from London University (1978) and a Diploma in Documentation in Berlin, the then Republic of Western Germany,(1984).

== Academic career ==
Thomas completed his two-year army conscription (1967–69) and then became a secondary teacher (1970). He was seconded as Head Librarian of the Cyprus Ministry of Education Library in Nicosia (1984–89). During his career he served as an Assistant Principal and then Principal in a series of secondary schools throughout Cyprus (1989–2002). He also wrote books that were used in Greek Cypriot secondary schools.

== Cypriot Scout Movement ==
Thomas became a Scout as a young boy. After his studies and his military service (1969) he was appointed commissioner of the Famagusta District Scout Commission.

When he moved to capital Nicosia in 1972, he became a member of the Nicosia District Commission and then of the Cyprus General Commission, taking responsibility for organising jamborees, tree plantings etc. He also started a Seniors Scout Division and launched and edited the scout magazine Forever Forward Πάντα Εμπρός.(in Greek)

The Obituary on Andreas Georgious Thomas in Panta Empros (Forever Forward) the Cypriot Scout Magazine. No. 12 Spring 2002, p 8.(in Greek)

== Literary career ==
Thomas was a prize-winning poet, short story writer and essayist. His important contribution to Greek Cypriot poetry has been highlighted by Georgios Kehagioglou and Leuteris Papaleontiou in History of Contemporary Cypriot Literature.(in Greek) When awarding the A. Diamantopoulos Prize (Athens 1987) the judging panel commented that the award went to Thomas for Mythic Summer ""especially for its high aesthetics and because it represents something "humane, peace-loving and patriotic." Βραβείο Αθ. Διαμαντόπουλου, Αθήνα 1987: Το βιβλίο Μυθικό Καλοκαίρι βραβεύτηκε διακρινόμενο για το αισθητικό του επίπεδο και για το ότι διαπνέεται για κάτι "το ανθρώπινο, το ειρηνικό και το πατριωτικό".

Literary Cypriot critic Andreas Philaktou said: "We can say that the poetic works of Andreas Thomas add to our literary tradition giving it a new life. Some of his poems were written after the disaster and they place Thomas among the top rank of the poets of his time."

Kehagioglou and Papaleontiou in History of Contemporary Cypriot Literature said about Thomas: "In his first collection Andreas Thomas, Small Sea City 1972 and especially in his love poems reigns an intense lyrical imagery rooted in the tradition of Elytis. The poet also draws on the traditions of Greek mythology so that he may approach current Cypriot political events." "In his more mature books ... Mikri Thalassini Politia B’ the (1974) disaster is presented more indirectly with symbols and surrealistic images mainly in the series “voices of death”, which represents the most powerful section of the book."

References of Thomas in History of Contemporary Cypriot Literature, 2010.

He wrote an essay on the poetry of Nikiforos Vrettakos. In 2003 twelve poems from his book Mythic Summer were put to music by Cypriot musician and composer Andreas Artemis.(in Greek)

== Poetry ==
- Little City by the Sea «Μικρή Θαλασσινή Πολιτεία» in Greek, 1972 printed by Atlas Printing office, Ch. Kyrou (Τυπογραφείο Άτλας, Χρ. Κύρου) (in Greek).
- Little City by the Sea II«Μικρή Θαλασσινή Πολιτεία Β’» in Greek, 1976,(honorary mention of Cultural Services of Ministry of Education of Cyprus Republic) printed by Atlas Printers, Τυπογραφείο Ατλας, Χρ. Κύρου (in Greek).
- Mythic Summer «Μυθικό Καλοκαίρι», 1987, printed by Kyrou Printing Office (Τυπογραφείο Κύρου). Awarded the Thanassis Diamantopoulos Prize, of the Greek Association of Writers) (in Greek).
- Poetry, «Ποίηση», Published posthumously, 2002, printed by Theoperes (ΘΕΟΠΡΕΣ) printing office, ISBN 9963-7629-1-3 (in Greek).
