= Onder =

Onder is a surname. Notable people with the surname include:

- Bob Onder (born 1962), American politician, attorney, and physician
- Luciano Onder (born 1943), Italian journalist and science broadcaster

== See also ==
- Önder
