= Andreas Krystallis =

Greek painter

- Born: 1911; Asia Minor (now in Turkey)
- Died: 1951; Piraeus, Greece
- Occupation: painter

Andreas Krystallis or Andreas Kristallis (Greek: Ανδρέας Κρυστάλλης, 1911–1951) was a Greek painter.

He was born in Asia Minor in which is now a part of Turkey, after the end of the Asia Minor Catastrophe, he moved to Mytilini on the island of Lesvos. He entered the Royal Greek Navy (now the Greek Navy) and finished his career with his larger brother. Quickly as he resigned because he wanted to delivered exclusively in writing, he moved to Piraeus. He visited Paris in 1928 where he lived for three years at the École de Beaux Arts. He returned to Greece and moved to Athens and in Mytilini. He died in Athens.

His work is about oil and water paintings with the knowledge mainly from the sea. He was a lyrical impressionist.
