= Andreas Schalk =

German politician (born 1984)

Member of the Landtag of Bavaria
- Incumbent
- Assumed office 13 June 2016
- Preceded by: Michael Brückner
- Constituency: Ansbach-Nord (2016–present)

Personal details
- Born: 21 March 1984 (age 42)
- Party: Christian Social Union

Andreas Schalk (born 21 March 1984) is a German politician serving as a member of the Landtag of Bavaria since 2016. He has served as chairman of the Christian Social Union in Ansbach since 2013.
