= Andreas of Samosata =

Bishop of Somasta

Andreas was a bishop of Samosata about 430 CE. He took part in the Nestorian controversy against Cyril, Patriarch of Alexandria, in answer to whose anathemas he wrote two books, of the first of which a large part is quoted by Cyril, in his Apol. adv. Orientales, and of the second some fragments are contained in the Hodegus of Anastasius Sinaita. Though prevented by illness from being present at the Council of Ephesus (around 431), he joined Theodoret in his opposition to the agreement between Cyril and John of Antioch, and, like Theodoret, he changed his course, but at a much earlier period. Modern scholars credit him with the being the most active mediator between the two sides of the conflict, having an essentially centrist stance but ultimately flip-flopping in his position considerably.

About 436 he yielded to the persuasions of John, and joined in the condemnation of Nestorius. Eight letters by him are extant in Latin in the Epistolae of Lupus Servatus.
