= Andreas J. Kumin =

Judge at the Court of Justice of the European Union
- In office 20 March 2019 – 6 October 2024
- Preceded by: Maria Berger

Personal details
- Born: 13 July 1965 (age 61) Graz, Austria
- Education: University of Graz; École nationale d'administration
- Occupation: Judge, Legal scholar
- Profession: Jurist
- Known for: European Union law, International law, Constitutional law

Andreas J. Kumin (born 13 July 1965) is an Austrian jurist and legal scholar serving as a judge at the Court of Justice of the European Union (CJEU) since March 2019. He was reappointed for a second term starting in October 2024.

== Early life and education ==
Kumin was born in Graz, Austria, in 1965. He studied law and translation sciences (English and French) at the University of Graz, obtaining his Magister iuris in 1987 and his Doctor of Laws in 1990. He also earned a diploma in public administration from the École nationale d'administration in France in 1992.

In October 2024, he was reappointed for a second term, extending his service until 6 October 2030.
