= Andreas Hofmeister =

German politician (born 1980)

- Hofmeister in 2019

Member of the Landtag of Hesse
- Incumbent
- Assumed office 18 January 2014
- Preceded by: Karlheinz Weimar
- Constituency: Limburg-Weilburg II

Personal details
- Born: 12 September 1980 (age 46)
- Party: Christian Democratic Union (since 2000)

Andreas Hofmeister (born 12 September 1980) is a German politician serving as a member of the Landtag of Hesse since 2014. He has served as state commissioner for expellees and resettlers since 2024. He has served as chairman of the Christian Democratic Union in Limburg-Weilburg since 2015.
