= Andreas Georgiou (economist) =

Greek economist

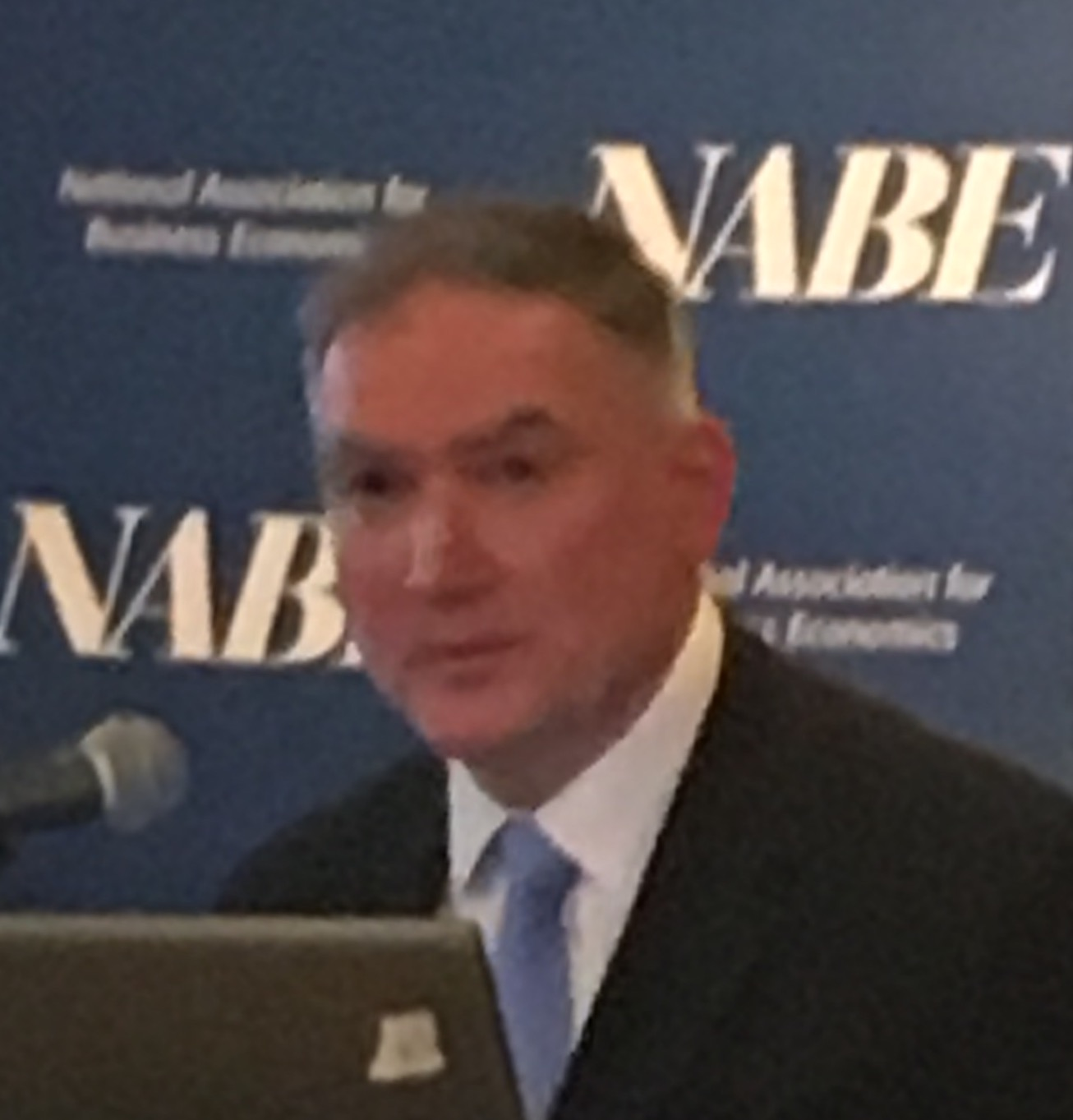

President of the Hellenic Statistical Authority (ELSTAT).
- In office August 2, 2010 – August 2, 2015

Personal details
- Education: Amherst College (B.A.); University of Michigan (Ph.D.)

Andreas Georgiou (Greek: Ανδρέας Γεωργίου, born Patras, 1960) is a Greek economist and former President of the Hellenic Statistical Authority (ELSTAT). In June 2021, he became the European Parliament’s representative at the European Statistical Governance Advisory Board, the body that provides an independent overview of the European Statistical System. Georgiou is a visiting lecturer and visiting scholar at Amherst College. He is also an elected member of the Council of the International Statistical Institute and a member of the Committee on Professional Ethics of the American Statistical Association.

== Biography ==
Georgiou completed his secondary education in Athens College, and studied at Amherst College, where he received his Bachelor of Arts (Summa Cum Laude) in Economics and in Political Science-Sociology. He went on to receive his Ph.D. in Economics from the University of Michigan with specialization in monetary theory and stabilisation policy as well as in International Trade and Finance.

From 1989 to July 2010 he was staff of the International Monetary Fund (IMF). He has been head of missions, responsible for the preparation, negotiation, and monitoring of economic programs with IMF member countries. From March 2004 to July 2010 he was deputy division chief in the IMF Statistics Department. During that period, among other things, he led the work of the statistical program for the methodological development and dissemination of new indicators of stability of financial systems (Financial Soundness Indicators). He has taught economics at the University of Michigan and as a visiting professor at the University of Economics in Bratislava. In addition, he has conducted seminars and courses in statistical methodologies for IMF staff as well as state officials of more than 120 countries.

On 2 August 2010, he was appointed President of the Hellenic Statistical Authority (ELSTAT), which has the responsibility to produce, on a regular basis, official statistics for Greece. On 2 August 2015, he resigned from office with immediate effect.

Since 2018, Georgiou has been a visiting lecturer in Economics and Statistics at Amherst College, where he teaches macroeconomics and statistical ethics.

In June 2021, the European Parliament elected Mr Georgiou near-unanimously to one of the seats on the seven-member European Statistical Governance Advisory Board (ESGAB).

== Accusation of Falsifying Greek Budget Statistics ==
In November 2010, after completing revised 2009 deficit and debt statistics of Greece, Georgiou transmitted them to Eurostat, without first receiving approval from the board of ELSTAT. In 2013, some members of the board accused him of artificially inflating the budget figures, 15.4% of GDP instead of 13.6% of GDP, and he was criminally charged with making a false statement.

In July 2016, the Greek Supreme Court upheld charges against Georgiou for having harmed the "national interest", with a possible sentence of up to 10 years in prison.

In June 2018, the Supreme Civil and Criminal Court of Greece ('Areopagus') sentenced Georgiou to two years on probation for violation of duty for not first submitting the budget report to the ELSTAT board.

On 18 September 2018, during a Special Meeting on National Statistical Offices’ Professional Independence: Threats and Responses immediately prior to the XVI International Association for Official Statistics Conference in Paris, a special Commendation was awarded to Mr. Georgiou by six major international statistical organizations. This Commendation was given to "acknowledge Andreas Georgiou‘s upholding of the highest professional standards in his public service in the pursuit of integrity of statistical systems".

Georgiou's prosecution has been denounced as a violation of scientific freedom and human rights by the American Statistical Association's Committee on Scientific Freedom and Human Rights and the editorial board of The Economist. The Financial Times reported, "The case has sparked outrage from economists and statisticians worldwide who believe Mr. Georgiou has become a scapegoat for Greece's political class."

In August 2026, the Greek Supreme Court annulled the conviction and exonerated Georgiou.

== See also ==
- Greek debt crisis of 2010
- First Cabinet of Alexis Tsipras (26 January 2015 – 27 August 2015)
- Judicial system of Greece
