= Andrée (given name) =

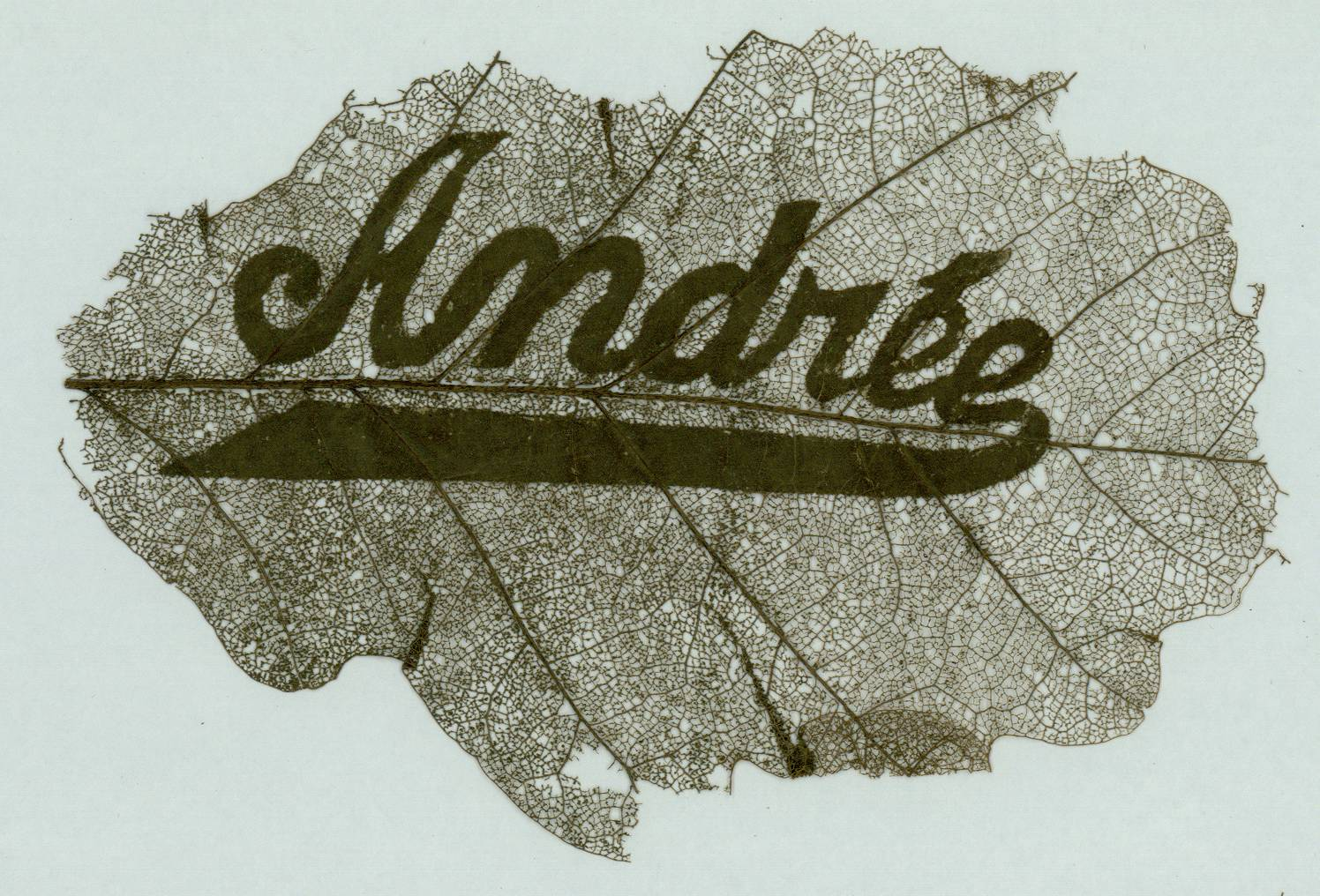

Andree or Andrée is a feminine given name.

== Variants and derivations by language ==
- Andrée : French, English
- Andréanne : French
- Andréane : French
- Andrea: Albanian, Italian, Latin, masculine; Croatian, Czech, Danish, English, Finnish, French, Galician, German, Hungarian, Icelandic, Italian, Macedonian, Norwegian, Romanian, Slovak, Spanish, Swedish, feminine
- Andréa : French and Portuguese
- Dédée : French
- Andréana : Malagasy
- Andrette : French, English
- Andretta : Italian
- Andréina : French
- Andréline : French, Haitian creole

=== Compound given name ===
- Andrée-Anne
- Anne-Andrée
- Marie-Andrée

== Given name ==
Notable people with the name include:

- Andree Anderson (fl. 1950s), American ice dancer
- Andrée Belle, French painter
- Andrée Bernard (born 1966), English television actress
- Andrée Blouin (1921–1986), activist and writer from the Central African Republic
- Andrée Boisson (1900–1973), French fencer
- Andrée Bonhomme (1905–1982), Dutch composer
- Andree Bonifacio (born 2002), Canadian-Filipino dancer, actress, and singer; former member of hip-hop dance duo group The Lucky Aces
- Andrée Borrel (1919–1944), French heroine of World War II
- Andrée Bosquet (1900–1980), Belgian painter
- Andrée Boucher (1937–2007) Canadian politician from Quebec
- Andrée Brendheden (born 1983), Swedish ice hockey forward
- Andrée Brunet (1901–1993), French figure skater
- Andrée Chedid (1920–2011), French poet and novelist of Lebanese descent
- Andrée Christensen (born 1952), Canadian writer and visual artist
- Andrée Clair (1916–1982), French writer and ethnographic studier of Niger
- Andree Connors, American poet and novelist
- Andrée Damant, French actress
- Andrée Dupeyron (1902–1988), French woman civil and military aviator who broke distance records in the 1930s
- Andrée de Jongh (1916–2007), Belgian resistance leader in World War II
- Andrée van Es (born 1953), Dutch politician
- Andrée Esposito (born 1934), French opera singer
- Andrée Ferretti (1935–2022), Canadian political figure and author
- Andrée Feix (1912–1987), French film editor and film director
- Andrée Flageolet (fl. 1961), French racing cyclist
- Andrée Geulen-Herscovici (1921–2022), Belgian Holocaust rescuer
- Andreé González (born 1975), Venezuelan footballer
- Andrée Grandjean (1910–1999), Belgian lawyer, member of the Belgian Resistance during Second World War.
- Andrée Hoppilliard (1909–1995), French aeronautical engineer
- Andrée Howard (1910–1968), British ballet dancer and choreographer
- Andrée Jacob (1906–2002), publisher, journalist, member of French Resistance during Second World War
- Andrée Jeglertz (born 1972), Swedish football manager and player
- Andrée Laberge (born 1953), Canadian researcher and writer
- Andrée Lachapelle (1931–2019), French Canadian actress
- Andrée Lafayette (1903–1989), French stage and film actress
- Andrée Lavieille (1887–1960), French painter
- Andrée Lescot (fl.1950s–1960s), Haitian singer, showgirl, and soprano
- Andrée Maillet (1921–1995), Canadian writer
- Andrée Marlière (1934–2008), Belgian ballet dancer and painter
- Andrée Marquet (born 1934), French organic chemist
- Andrée Méry (1876–1968), French actress, playwright and translator
- Andrée Mégard (1869–1952), French actress, stage beauty
- Andrée Melly (1932–2020), English actress
- Andrée A. Michaud (born 1957), Canadian novelist and playwright
- Andrée Peel (1905–2010), French resistance member of World War II
- Andrée Putman (1925–2013), French interior and product designer
- Andree Layton Roaf (1941–2009), American lawyer and jurist from Arkansas
- Andrée Rosenfeld (1934–2008), Belgian rock art researcher and archaeologist
- Andrée Rosier (born 1978), French chef
- Andrée Ruellan (1905–2006), American artist
- Andrée Ruffo, Canadian judge from Quebec
- Andrée Sfeir-Semler (born 1953), Lebanese art historian and gallery owner
- Andrée Tainsy (1911–2004), Belgian actress
- Andrée Taurinya (born 1963), French politician
- Andrée Vaurabourg (1894–1980), French pianist and teacher
- Andrée Viollis (1870–1950), French journalist and writer
- Andrée Watters (born 1983), Canadian musician
- Andree Welge (born 1972), German darts player
- Andree Wiedener (born 1970), German footballer

== See also ==
- Andree (surname)
- Andrée (disambiguation)
- Marie-Andrée, given name
- André, given name
