= Andree (surname) =

Andree or Andrée is a surname. Notable people with the name include:

- Denice Andrée, Swedish model and beauty queen
- Elfrida Andrée (1841–1929), Swedish organist, composer, and conductor
- Harry Andree (1913–1944), Nazi German Oberstleutnant during World War II
- Karl Andree (1808–1875), German geographer
- George Andree (1879–1934), American college football coach
- Ingrid Andree (born 1931), German actress
- John Andree (disambiguation), multiple people, including:
  - John Andree (physician) (c. 1699–1785), British physician, father of the surgeon
  - John Andree (surgeon) (fl. 1790), English surgeon, son of the physician
- Leif Andrée (born 1958), Swedish actor
- Paul J. Andree (1924–2014), American college football coach
- Richard Andree (1835–1912), German geographer and cartographer
- Richard V. Andree (1919–1987), American mathematician and computer scientist
- Salomon August Andrée (1854–1897), Swedish engineer, physicist, aeronaut and polar explorer

== See also ==
- Andrée (given name)
- Andrée (disambiguation)
- Andre (surname)
