= John Andree =

John Andree may refer to:

- John Andree (physician) (c. 1699–1785), British physician, father of the surgeon
- John Andree (surgeon) (fl. 1790), English surgeon, son of the physician

== See also ==
- Andree (surname)
