= Andrée =

Andrée or Andree may refer to:

== People ==
- Andrée (given name)
- Andree (surname)

== Places ==
- Andree, Minnesota, unincorporated community in Stanchfield Township, Isanti County, Minnesota
- 1296 Andrée, asteroid
- Andrée Land (Svalbard)
- Andrée Land (Greenland)
- Mount Andree, Heard Island
- Andrée Island, Antarctica

== See also ==
- Andre (disambiguation)
