= Cave Bay =

Cave Bay may refer to:

- Cave Bay, Barbados
- Cave Bay (Heard Island)
