= Finsbury Dispensary =

Charitable dispensary giving medical treatment to poor people

Coordinates: 51.522448°N 0.101875°W

The Finsbury Dispensary, more fully the Finsbury Dispensary for Administering Advice and Medicines to the Poor, was a charitable dispensary giving medical treatment to poor people in Finsbury, on the edge of the City of London. It was founded in 1780 by a Quaker, one George Friend. It operated from various premises during its existence in the 19th century, notably, between 1819 and 1838 it occupied a large, well-appointed house in St. John's Street, where it was sometimes called the New Finsbury Dispensary.

A number of well-known surgeons and physicians worked at the Finsbury Dispensary. These include;

- John Andree (appointed 1781)
- William Charles Wells (appointed 1790)
- Charles Aldis
- Golding Bird (appointed 1836)
- James Paget (appointed 1841)
- Charles West (appointed 1841)
