= Andrée Marquet =

French chemist (born 1934)

Andrée Marquet (born 1934), is a French chemist specializing in organic chemistry and chemical biology, professor emeritus at the Pierre and Marie Curie University and correspondent at the French Academy of sciences since 1993.

== Biography ==
Andrée Marquet studied engineering at the École nationale supérieure de chimie de Paris, then defended a thesis prepared at the Collège de France under the direction of Jean Jacques (1961), followed by a post-doctoral internship at the ETH in Zurich with Professor Duilio Arigoni. After a career at the CNRS, she was appointed professor at the Pierre-et-Marie-Curie University (1978) and founded the organic biological chemistry laboratory there. She contributed, with a few others, to the development of this interface sub-discipline at the national level, which was still in its infancy, and created at UPMC adapted teaching courses where chemists and biochemists could meet.

In addition to her work as a teacher-researcher, she has held various positions of general interest.

Between 1984 and 1986, she chaired the organic chemistry division of the Société chimique de France, and from 1987 to 1991, the Société Franco-japonaise de chimie fine et thérapeutique. She chaired section 20 of the CNRS National Committee (1991–1995) and was a member of the CNRS Scientific Council from 1992 to 1997. In 1998, she became Scientific Director of the Chemistry Department at the Research Department of the MENRT. Between 1999 and 2003, she was a member of the Board of Directors of the Palais de la Découverte, and between 2007 and 2008, she was a member of the Board of Directors of the MENRT.

2011, member of the Ethics Committee of the CNRS. In 2002, she founded the "Chemistry and Society" Commission, within the Fondation de la Maison de la Chimie, of which she remains president until 2011. This commission seeks to analyse the origin of the misunderstanding that has developed between chemistry and society, and to contribute to the search for solutions by organising actions resolutely directed towards the general public.

== Research ==
Andrée Marquet and her collaborators have been interested in reaction mechanisms in organic chemistry, in particular those involving carbanions (enolates, alpha anions of sulfoxides), and have used the results of these studies in synthesis, for example for total synthesis of biotin.

She then turned to mechanistic enzymology, applying the approach used in organic chemistry to the functioning of enzymes.

The main areas covered are :

- steroid biochemistry: inhibition of the biosynthesis of aldosterone (among the various compounds synthesized and tested, 18-vinyl progesterone proved to be an excellent inhibitor of Cytochrome P450 involved in the last stage of this biosynthesis, making this molecule a potential hypotensor.
- the mechanism of action of vitamin K, an essential cofactor in the cascade of blood coagulation reactions.
- the biotin biosynthesis pathway: the mechanism of several of the enzymes involved has been deciphered and various inhibitors have been designed and synthesized. A particularly difficult problem to which Andrée Marquet and her team have made a decisive contribution is that of the mechanism of biotin synthase, which catalyses the final step.

They have shown that it belongs to the newly discovered family of proteins (Fe-S) dependent on S-Adenosylmethionine, catalysing radical reactions. This is a family that opens a new chapter in enzymology.

Another field of activity of the laboratory, the result of a collaboration with the neurobiology laboratory of the Collège de France (Prof. Jacques Glovinski) concerns the activity of a family of peptide neurotransmitters, the tachykinins.

== Main publications ==
- A. Marquet, De l’arme chimique à l’agent thérapeutique. L’Actualité Chimique, 2014, N°391, XIII-XVIII.
- A. Marquet et Y. Jacquot. Faut-il avoir peur du Bisphenol A ? L’Actualité Chimique, 2013, N°378-379,11-19.
- A. Marquet et B.Sillion, coordinateurs. Chimie et Société : Quel dialogue ? L’Actualité Chimique, 2011, N°355.
- A. Marquet, B. Tse Sum Bui, AG. Smith, MJ. Warren. Iron-sulfur proteins as initiators of radical chemistry. Nat. Prod. Rep., 2007; 24 : 1027–1040.
- M. Lotierzo, B. Tse Sum Bui, D. Florentin, F. Escalettes, A. Marquet. Biotin synthase mechanism: An overview. Biochemical Society Transactions, 2005, 33, 820 – 823.
- B. Rüdiger, B. Tse Sum Bui, V. Schünemann, D. Florentin, A. Marquet, A..S. Trautwein. Iron-sulfur clusters of biotin synthase in vivo: a Mössbauer study. Biochemistry, 2002, 41, 15000–15006.
- E. Davioud, A. Piffeteau, C. Delorme, S. Coustal, A. Marquet.18-Vinyldeoxycorticosterone: a potent inhibitor of the bovine cytochrome P-450_{11b}. Bioorganic and Medicinal Chemistry, 1998, 6, 1781–1788.
- A. Vidal-Cros, M. Gaudry, A. Marquet. Vitamin K dependent carboxylation. Mechanistic studies with 3-fluoroglutamate containing substrates. Biochemical Journal, 1990, 266, 749–755.
- G. Chassaing and A. Marquet. A ^{13} C NMR study of the structure of sulfur-stabilized carbanions. Tetrahedron, 1978, 34, 1399.
- S. Lavielle, S. Bory, B. Moreau, M.J. Luche and A. Marquet. A total synthesis of biotin based on the stereoselective alkylation of sulfoxides. J. Am. Chem. Soc., 1978, 100, 1558.

== Honours and awards ==
1961: Eugène Schuëller Prize (ENSCP)

1971: prize of the Organic Chemistry Division of the French Chemical Society

1986: La Caze Prize of the French Academy of sciences and Berthelot Medal of the French Academy of sciences

1988: CNRS silver medal

1993: Corresponding member of the French Academy of sciences.

1994: Achille-Le-Bel Grand Prize of the Chemical Society of France.

2000: Officier of the Ordre National du Mérite

2012: Officier of the Ordre national de la Légion d'Honneur

2018: Commandeur in the Ordre des Palmes Académiques
