= Andrée-Anne =

Andrée-Anne is a French feminine given name. Notable people with this given name include:

- Andrée-Anne Côté (born 1998), Canadian synchronized swimmer
- Andrée-Anne Dupuis-Bourret, Canadian artist

== See also ==
- Andréanne
- André
- Andrée
