= André (surname) =

Andre or André is a French surname. Notable people with the surname include:

- Alix André (1909–2000), French romance novelist
- André André (born 1989), Portuguese footballer
- Annette Andre (born 1939), Australian actor
- António André (born 1957), Portuguese footballer
- Benjamin André (born 1990), French footballer
- Carl Andre (1935–2024), American minimalist sculptor
- Dores André, Spanish ballet dancer
- Édouard André (1833–1894), French art collector
- Édouard André (1840–1911), French landscape architect
- A girl from the Elise André incident
- Émile André (1871–1933), French architect
- Eric Andre (born 1983), American comedian
- Florent André (born 1991), French footballer
- Fred André (1941–2017), Dutch footballer and football manager
- Johanna André (1861–1926), German soprano and voice teacher
- John André (1750–1780), British officer hanged as a spy during the American Revolution
- John André (1923–1976), American baseball player
- Lili André (born 1970), Swedish politician
- Louis André (1838–1913), French General and Minister of War
- Mark Andre (born 1964), French composer
- Maurice André (1933–2012), French trumpeter
- Michel André (mathematician) (1936–2009), Swiss mathematician
- Michel André (bobsleigh) (born 1970), French bobsledder
- Peter Andre (born 1973), Australian singer
- Pierre Andre (born 1985), Malaysian actor.
- Pierre-Yves André (born 1974), French footballer
- Soraia André (born 1964), Brazilian judoka
- Valérie André (1922–2025), French neurosurgeon and general
- Yves André (born 1959), French mathematician

== See also ==
- Andree (surname)
- Fabrizio De André (1940–1999), Italian singer-songwriter
