= Andréanne =

Female given name

- Pronunciation: ɑ̃.dʁe.an
- Gender: feminine
- Language: French

Origin
- Languages: Greek, Hebrew
- Region of origin: France, Switzerland, Belgium, Canada, Quebec

Other names
- Alternative spelling: Andrée-Anne, Andréane, Andréan, Andréann
- Related names: Andréane, Andreanne, Andreane, Andréan (unisex)

Andreanne (French: Andréanne) is a French feminine given name. It is used in France, Switzerland, Belgium, Canada and Quebec. Alternative spellings are Andréan, Andréane, Andrée-Anne.

== Notable people ==
Notable people with this name include:

- Andréanne Abbondanza-Bergeron (born ?), Canadian artist
- Andréanne Lafond (1919–2012), French-born Canadian journalist
- Andreanne Nouyrigat (born 1990), French actress

== See also ==
- Andrée
- André
