= Andre (disambiguation) =

Andre or André is the French form of the given name Andrew.

Andre or André may also refer to:

== People ==
- Andre (surname)
- Andre (given name)
- André (artist) (born 1971), Swedish-Portuguese graffiti artist
- André (singer), Armenian singer
- André the Giant, actor and wrestler

=== Fictional people ===
- André, character in 1984 film The Adventures of André and Wally B.
- André Harris, a character from the Nickelodeon TV series Victorious

== Places ==
- Andre, Estonia, a village in Põlva Parish, Põlva County Estonia
- André, CAR, a village in the Central African Republic near Abiras
- André, Ouest, a rural settlement in Haiti

== Music ==
- André (band), rock band from Quebec, Canada

== Films and plays ==
- Andre (film), 1994 film adaptation of the book A Seal Called Andre
- André (play), William Dunlap play

== Other uses ==
- André (car), British sports car
- André (wine), brand of sparkling wine
- André, an 1834 novel by George Sand

== See also ==
- Andrew
