= Andrée Rosier =

French chef

- Born: 20 November 1978 (age 47); Bayonne, Pyrénées-Atlantiques, France
- Culinary career
- Rating: Michelin stars
- Current restaurant: Les Rosiers (Biarritz)

Andrée Rosier (French pronunciation: [ɑ̃dʁe ʁozje], born 20 November 1978) is a French chef, Meilleur Ouvrier de France and one star at the Guide Michelin.

== Life and career ==
Andrée Rosier was born in Bayonne in a family of farmers from the Pays Basque. She became passionate in cooking during her childhood and started in 1994 a hotel training in Biarritz. After her final exam, she began her career in 1998 as a cooking assistant at the Villa Eugénie of the Hôtel du Palais in Biarritz. She pursued in 2000, still as a cooking assistant, in the three starred restaurant Louis XV in Monaco with Alain Ducasse. She then became a sous-chef in 2001 at the restaurant La Chèvre d'Or in Èze, Alpes-Maritimes with the two starred chef Philippe Labbé, and from 2004 to 2008, she is hired as a sous-chef at the restaurant L'Hippocampe of the Hôtel du Palais in Biarritz with Jean-Marie Gautier.

Andrée Rosier became in 2007 and only at the age of 28, the first woman to receive the title of Meilleur Ouvrier de France.

In 2008, she founded her own restaurant Les Rosiers located in Biarritz, where she works with her husband Stéphane. She received her first Michelin star in 2009.

== See also ==
- List of Michelin starred restaurants
