= Andrée Bonhomme =

Dutch composer (1905–1982)

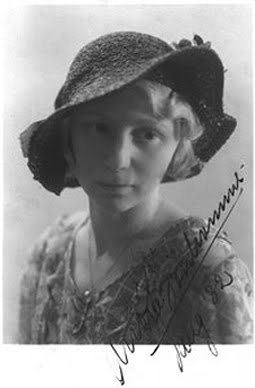
Andrée Bonhomme

Andrée Marie Clémence Bonhomme (1 December 1905 – 1 March 1982) was a Dutch composer.

== Life ==
Andrée Bonhomme was born in Maastricht on December 1, 1905. She studied from age seven piano with Maria Gielen. In 1920 Gielen with her pupils joined the Maastricht Music School. Since then, the fifteen year old girl also studied music theory and composition with Henri Hermans. She went to a Preparatory Teacher Training College and received teaching certificates in 1924 and 1927. In the meantime she studied piano on a professional level and got her certificates in 1929 (theory) and 1930 (practical). In 1927 she got a job as accompagneur at keyboards (piano, celesta) with the Maastricht Municipal Orchestra and made her debut as pianist and composer in 1928. From 1930 to 1937 she intermittently took lessons in composition with Darius Milhaud in Paris.

After completing her studies, Bonhomme worked as a composer and as a pianist with the Maastricht Orchestra, and in 1932 took a position teaching music theory and piano at the Heerlen music school. Bonhomme wrote a number of works and songs on French texts, but her career declined during the World War II, as she refused to sign a "non-Jewish declaration". She resigned from her orchestra position, and performance of her works was restricted to house concerts. Immediately after the Liberation of Maastricht (13/14 september 1944) she rejoined the orchestra until 1947.

In December 1970 she officially retired from teaching, although she still coached some of her last pupils for some years. In 1972 she suffered a stroke, which put an end to all activities. In the same year she received a royal honor and a yearly financial grant from the government. Bonhomme, a chain smoker, died in a nursing home in Brunssum from injuries caused by falling asleep with a burning cigarette.

A string quartet apparently commissioned by Matty Niël and completed in February 1957 was posthumously premiered at the Limburg Composer Day in 1989. Her papers are housed in the Dutch Institute of Music in The Hague (now: Kunstmuseum Den Haag. A shadow archive rests with the Historisch Centrum Limburg (regional archives) at Maastricht.

== Works ==
Bonhomme composed 51 works from 1920 to 1955. Selected works include:

- Drie schetsen, 1928
- Pièce en forme de sonatine for violoncello and piano, 1943
- Quatre Melodies Tristan Klingsor, 1955
- Sheherazade, song cycle, 1960
- La Flute de jade
- Chansons de flûte
- Berceuse
- Le tombeau d’Antar
