= John Andree (surgeon) =

English surgeon

John Andree, junior (fl. 1790), was an English surgeon.

== Life ==
Andree was born about 1740, the son of Dr. John Andree, senior, to whom one of his books is dedicated. He was apprenticed to Mr. Grindall, senior surgeon to the London Hospital, and in 1766 he appears as a lecturer on anatomy in London, and surgeon to the Magdalen Hospital, and practising in Carey Street, Chancery Lane. In 1780 he was a candidate for the surgeoncy to the London Hospital, but was defeated by William Blizard. In 1781 he became surgeon to the Finsbury Dispensary, and in 1784 to St. Clement Danes workhouse. About the year 1798 he took the degree of M.D., though it does not appear in what university, and afterwards practised for some years in Hertford, but afterwards returned to London. He died some time after 1819.

== Surgical innovator ==
Andree published several books, chiefly on surgical subjects. Through not being connected with a large hospital, he never took a leading position as a surgeon in London, but he performed one operation of historical importance. This was a successful operation of tracheotomy for the relief of croup of the larynx in February 1782, which, if not the first on record, since priority is claimed for an operation by Martin in 1730, was the first to attract attention. The patient was a five-year-old boy, who completely recovered. The case is described by Andree himself in a letter to Sir Astley Cooper, published in the appendix to a paper on ‘Cynanche Laryngea’ by Dr. John Richard Farre (Med.-Chir. Transactions, 1812, iii. 335), but had been previously related in 1786 in an inaugural dissertation by Dr. T. White, published at Leyden in that year. The same operation was done in 1812 by Sir Astley Cooper himself, and afterwards became celebrated in the hands of Bretonneau and Trousseau. In Andree's operation the annular cartilages were not divided, but only two punctures made in the membrane between them. No tube was introduced.

== Works ==
- On a Case of Suppression of Urine, Medical Observations and Enquiries, vol. V, 1776
- Essay on Gonorrhœa, London, 1777
- Observations on the Venereal Disease, London, 1779
- Account of an Elastic Trochar, Constructed on a New Principle, for Tapping the Hydrocele, or Watery Rupture, London, 1781
- Considerations on Bilious Diseases, Hertford, 1788; second edition, London, 1790
- Cases and Observations [in Surgery], London, 1799
