= Andrée Belle =

French painter

Andrée Belle (?–?) was a French painter.

== Early life ==
Andrée Belle was born in Paris. She was a pupil of Jean-Charles Cazin (1840–1901).

== Career ==
Belle painted in oils and pastels, landscapes especially, of which she exhibited seventeen in June, 1902. The larger part of these were landscape portraits. The subjects were well represented, and the various hours of day, with characteristic lighting, unusually well rendered. At the Salon des Beaux Arts, 1902, this artist exhibited a large pastel, "A Halt at St. Mammes" and a "Souvenir of Bormes", showing the tomb of Cazin. In 1903, she exhibited a pastel called "Calvary," which became part of the collection of the Musée de Picardie at Amiens; it was praised for its harmony of color and the manner in which the rainbow is represented. Her pictures of "Twilight" and "Sunset " are unusually successful. She was a member of the Société Nationale des Beaux-Arts.
