= Elise André incident =

The Elise André incident was a child custody diplomatic incident involving several kidnappings of Elise André-Belenkaya (Russian: Элиза Андре Беленькая) in a dispute between her French father Jean-Michel André and her Russian mother Irina Belenkaya (Russian: Ирина Беленькая) between 2007 and 2009. André-Belenkaya had been abducted across international borders at least three times since her parents divorced in 2007.

Both parents were granted custody rights from their own countries. André-Belenkaya's case was aggravated by the fact that at the time, Russia was not a signatory of the Hague Convention on the Civil Aspects of International Child Abduction.

The last kidnapping (by Irina Belenkaya) was stopped in Nyíregyháza, Hungary in April 2009 and in May, the Hungarian court ordered that Belenkaya be extradited to France

In 2012, Irina Belenkaya faced a three-year suspended sentence from a French court in Tarascon for double abduction - once in November 2007 and once in March 2009. Belenkaya's lawyer asked for a suspended sentence. Eventually she received two years of sentence suspended for five years. The Russian Ministry of Foreign affairs concluded that the decision of the French court had been balanced.
