= Andree Connors =

American poet and novelist

Andrée Connors
- Born: Andree Connors
- Died: 2001
- Occupation: poet

Andrée Connors (died 2001) was an American poet, novelist and fiction writer.

== Biography ==
A celebrated figure, her work and her life are the subject of a permanent exhibition at the Mendocino County Museum. Before her death, Andree Connors legally changed her name to Andree O'Connor.

Amateur People was first published by the Fiction Collective in 1977, and has remained in print since that time. She spent her life in a renovated mobile home and roamed around the region of Mendocino County, after changing the interior of an old international bakery van she created a unique trailer home using old redwood strips, vibrant fabrics and treasured objects, where she lived in for quite a few years.

At the time of the publication of Amateur People in 1977, Connors was interviewed on WBAI in New York on Big Al's Literary Salon & Pool Hall by Alen Pol Kobryn.

Connors died 2001 from breast cancer, and before her death, she donated the van to the Mendocino County Museum.
