= Vinyl cation =

Organic cation

The vinyl cation is a carbocation with the positive charge on an alkene carbon. Its empirical formula of the parent ion is C_{2}H^{+}_{3}. Vinyl cation are invoked as reactive intermediates in solvolysis of vinyl halides, as well as electrophilic addition to alkynes and allenes.

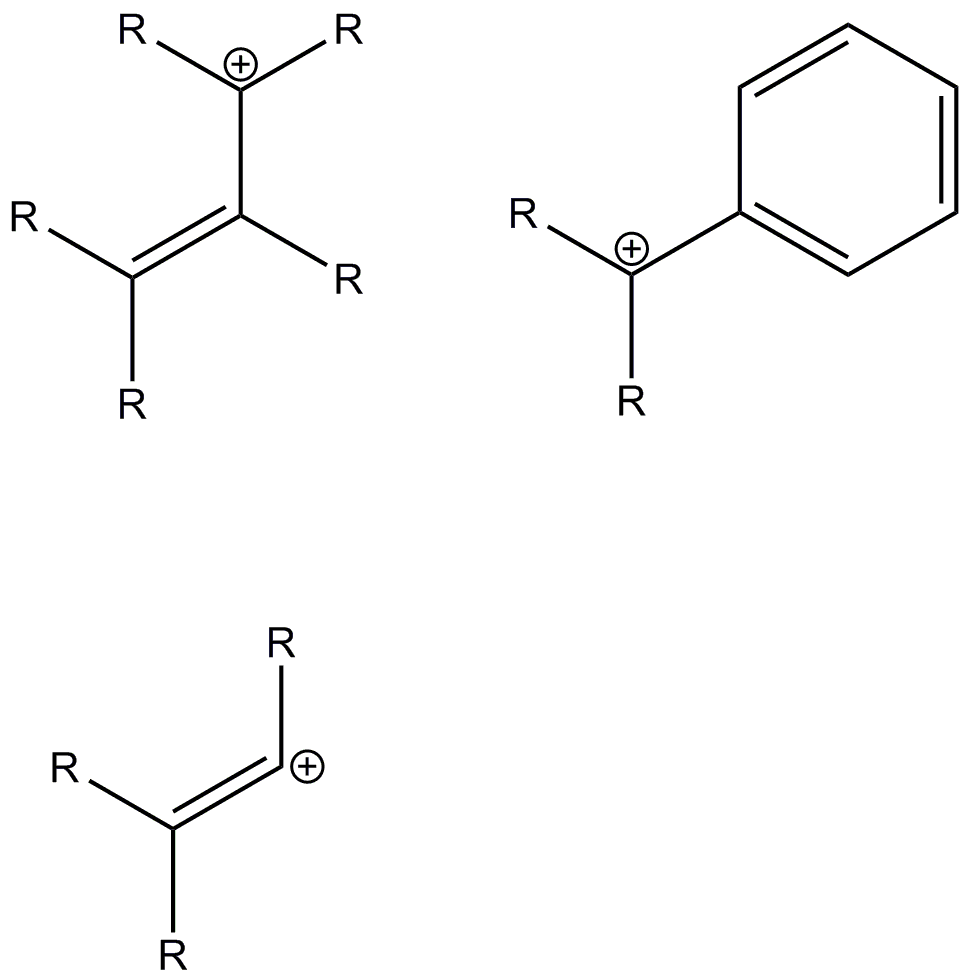
Note that unlike the allyl and benzyl carbocations (top left and right, respectively), the electron-deficient carbon of the vinyl carbocation (bottom) is double-bonded.

== History ==
Vinyl cations have long been poorly-understood and were initially thought to be too high energy to form as reactive intermediates. Vinyl cations were first proposed in 1944 as a reactive intermediate for the acid-catalyzed hydrolysis of alkoxyacetylenes to give alkyl acetate. In the first step of their facile hydration reaction, which was the rate limiting step, a vinyl cation reactive intermediate was proposed; the positive charge was believed to formally lie on a dicoordinate carbon. This is the first time such a transition state can be found in the literature.

In 1959, Grob and Cseh detected vinyl cations during solvolysis reactions of alpha-vinyl halides. Indeed, for this contribution, Grob has been called “the father of the vinyl cation”. The 1960s saw a flurry of vinyl cation-related research, with kinetics data driving the argument for the existence of the species. Noyce and coworkers, for example, reported the formation of a vinyl cation in acid-catalyzed hydration of phenylpropiolic acid. The authors note that in the rate limiting step, a large positive charge develops on the benzylic carbon, indicating that the reaction proceeds through a vinyl cation transition state. Hyperconjugation and hydrogen bonding was evoked to explain the accessibility of the vinyl cation described by Noyce.

== Generation ==
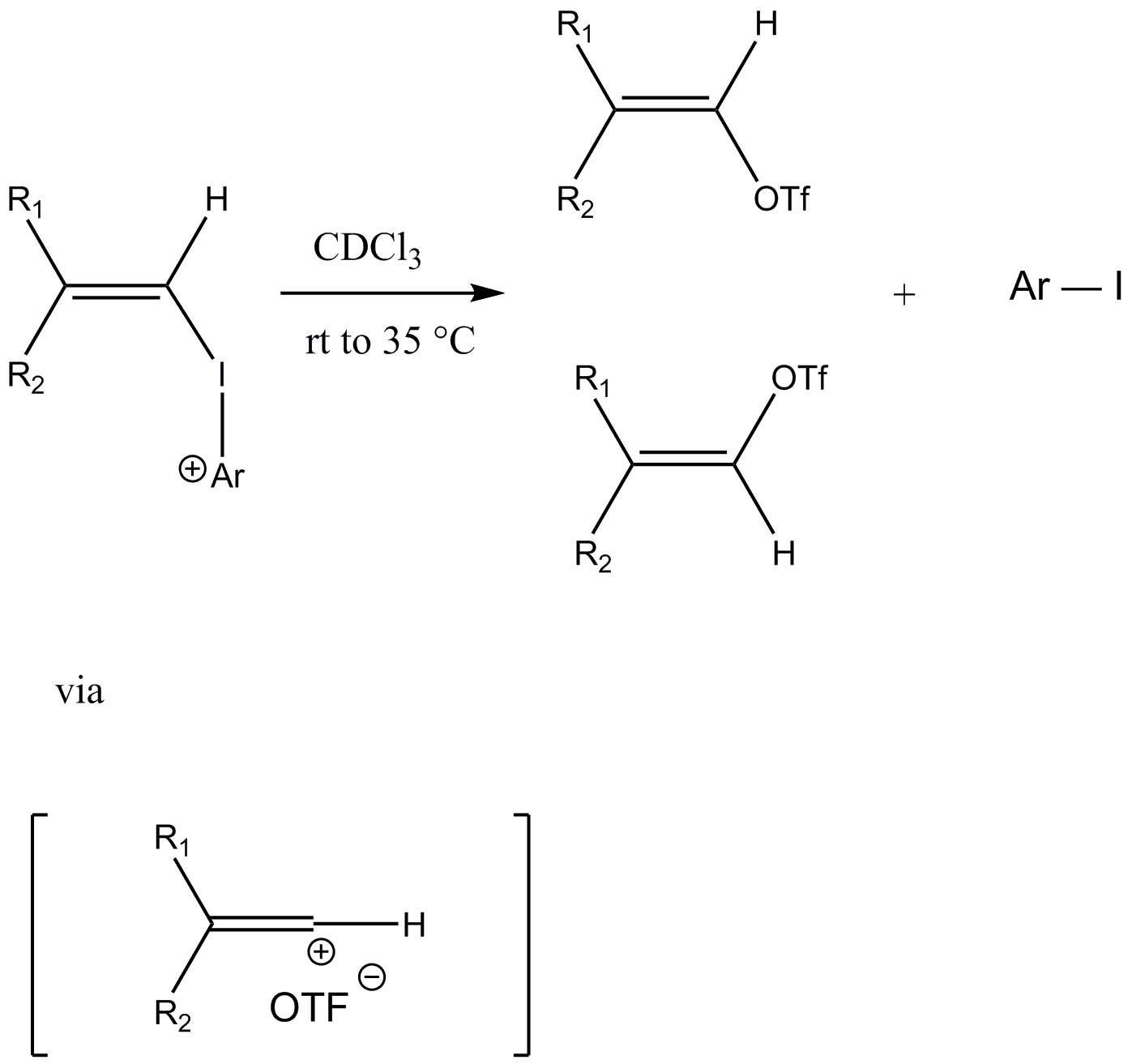
Generation of a vinyl cation reactive intermediate. Adapted from

Vinyl cations have been observed as reactive intermediates during solvolysis reactions. Consistent with S_{N}1 chemistry, these reactions follow first order kinetics. Generally, vinylic halides are unreactive in solution: silver nitrate does not precipitate silver halides in the presence of vinyl halides, and this fact was historically used to dispute the existence of the vinyl cation species. The introduction of “super” leaving group in the 1970s first allowed for the generation of vinyl cation reactive intermediates with appreciable lifetimes. These excellent leaving groups, such as triflate (trifluoromethanesulfonate) and nonaflate (nonafluorobutanesulfonate), are highly prone to S_{N}1 reactivity. Utilization of these super leaving groups allowed researchers for the first time to move beyond speculation about the existence of such vinyl cations.

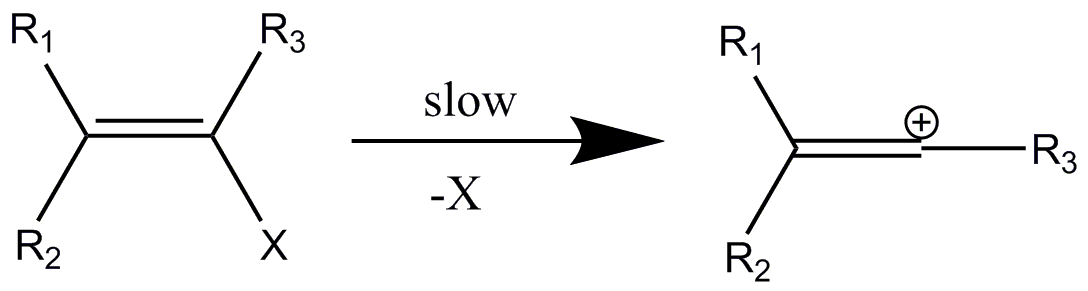
Vinyl cation formation through carbon-halogen bond cleavage. Adapted from

Other leaving groups, such as hypervalent iodine moities (which are 1 million fold better leaving groups than the classic triflates), have been utilized to such end as well. Hinkle and coworkers synthesized a number of alkenyl(aryl)iodonium triflates from hypervalent phenyliodo precursors. In the scheme shown, the E- and Z-vinyl triflates form after heterolytic carbon-iodine bond cleavage and subsequent trapping of the cation by triflate. The presence of both E- and Z-vinyl triflate products offers support for the formation of a primary vinyl cation reactive intermediate; through S_{N}2 chemistry, both only one isomer would form.

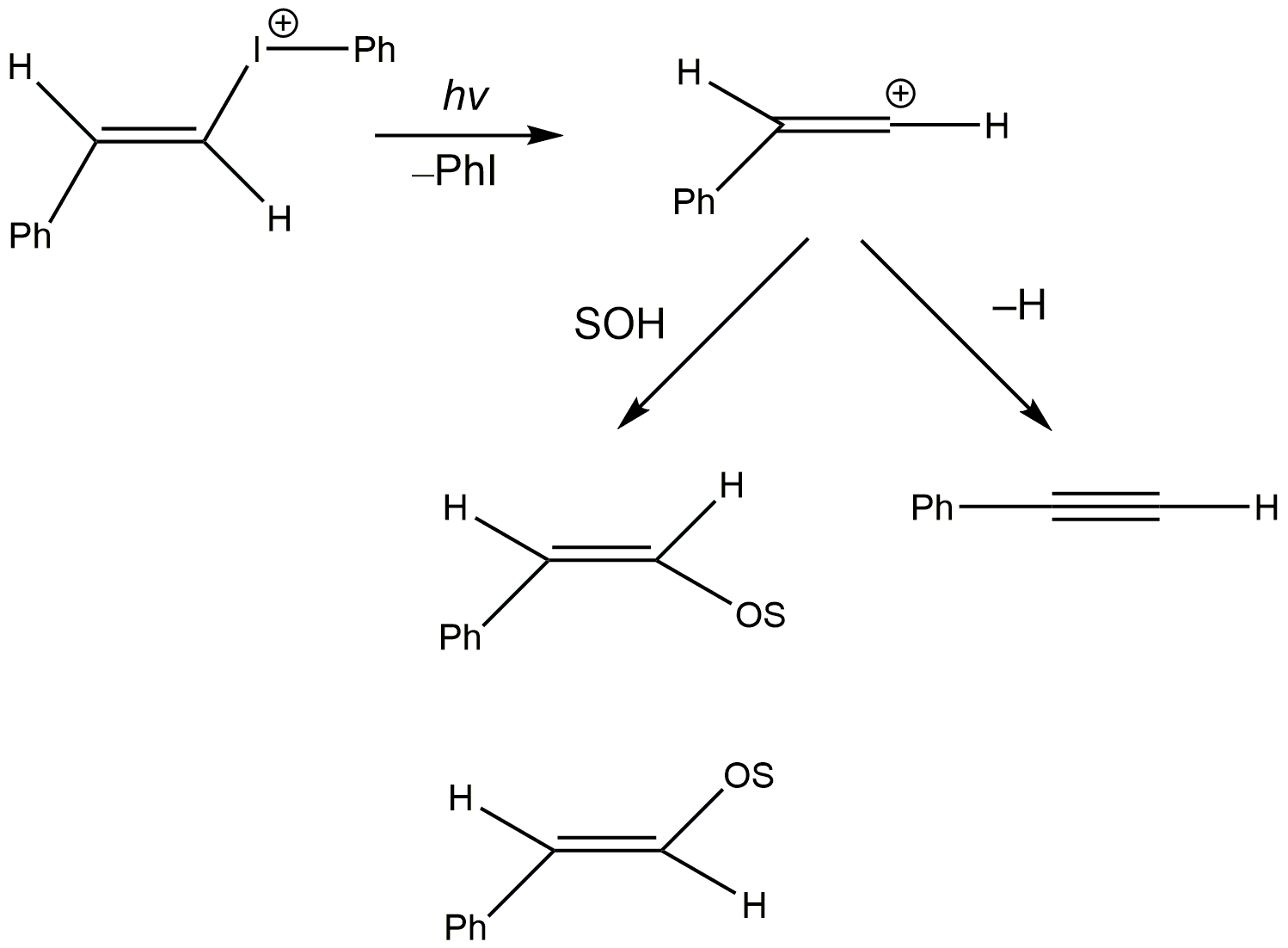
Photoproducts from vinyl iodonium salt. Note: products from possible vinyl cation rearrangement not pictured here. Adapted from

Vinyl cation reactive intermediates have been generated in photochemical solvolysis reactions. The figure to the right depicts photochemical solvolysis of vinyl iodonium salt, through heterolytic carbon-iodine bond cleavage, to generate a vinyl carbocation and iodobenzene. The reactive intermediate is prone to either nucleophilic attack by the solvent to yield E- and Z-enol ether isomers, or beta hydrogen elimination.

=== Generation of cyclic vinyl cations ===
The ease of generating cyclic vinyl cations depends on the size of the ring system, with vinyl cations residing on smaller rings being more difficult to produce. This trend is supported by calculations showing that the vinyl cation prefers a linear arrangement. Due to the high degree of strain in 3-membered ring systems, the generation of the smallest cyclic vinyl cation, cycloprop-1-enyl cation, remains elusive. The S_{N}1 solvolysis chemistry used to produce other vinyl cations has not proven facile for the cycloprop-1-enyl cation. This is a chemical challenge that remains unsolved.

== Structure ==
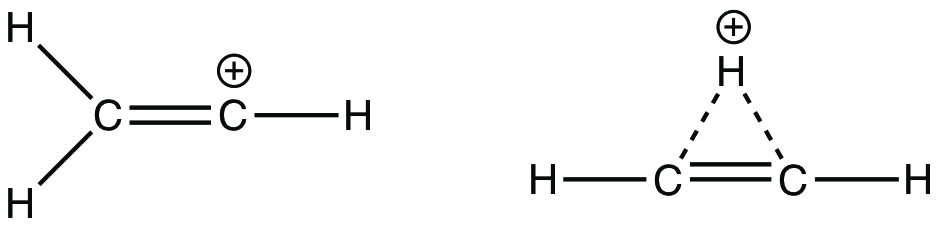
Linear and bridged structure of vinyl cation C_{2}H^{+}_{3}. Adapted from

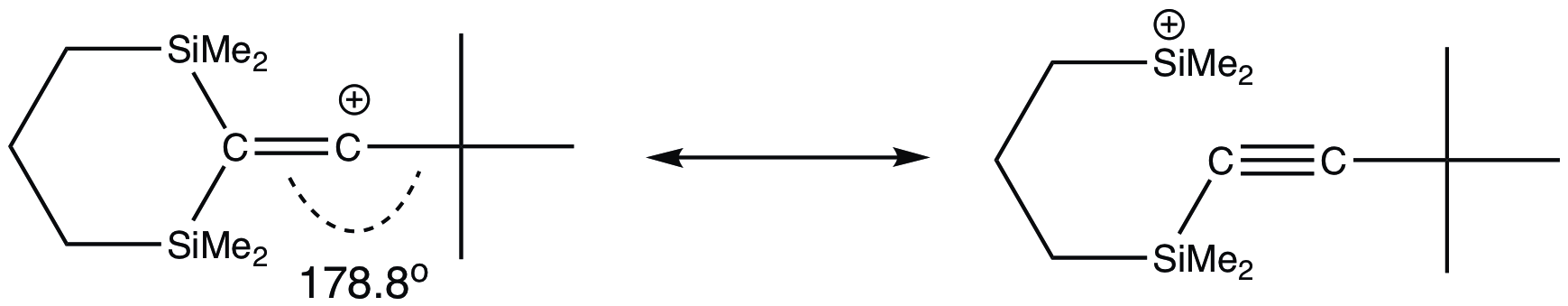
Resonance structure of β-silyl substituted vinyl cation that exhibits hyperconjugation. The bond angle from the X-ray structure is also noted. Adapted from

Two possible structures can be envisioned for C_{2}H^{+}_{3}, the simplest vinyl cation: a classical linear or a non-classical bridged structure. Ab initio calculations favor the bridged structure vs the classical by 5.0 kcal/mol. For substituted vinyl cations, however, the linear structure is supported by ^{13}C and ^{1}H NMR measurements. NMR spectroscopy of β-silyl vinyl cations exhibited a single ^{29}Si NMR signal which implies that the two Si are equivalent. The vinyl cation has an intense IR peak at 1987 cm^{−1} for the C=C^{+} stretching. The crystallography reveals the bond angles between the vinyl cation carbons and the first carbon of the alkyl substituted to be near 180^{o}.

== Stability ==
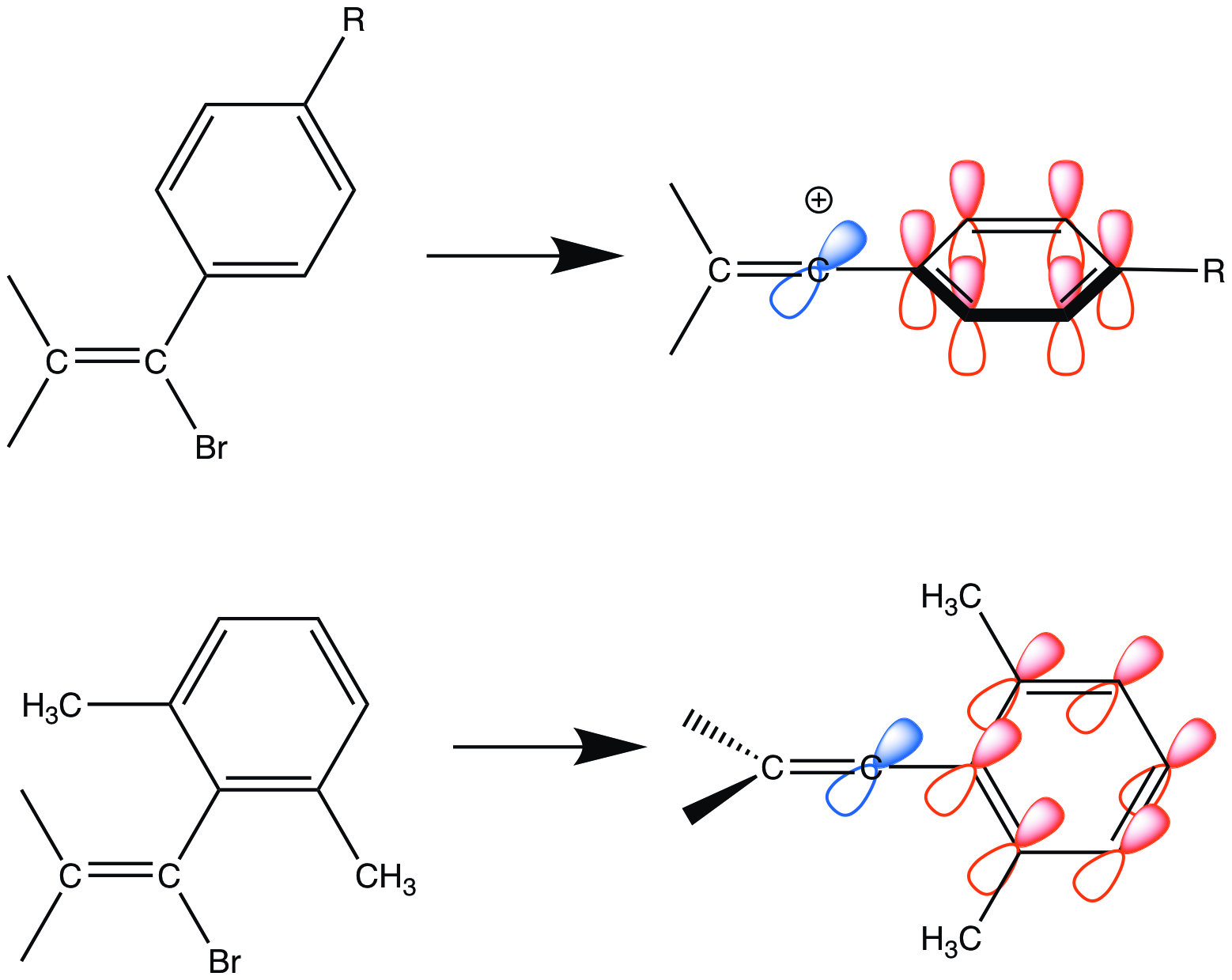
Electron conjugation in arylvinyl cation.

Initially it was believed that the existence of vinyl cations was questionable because of the large energy difference between it and its vinyl precursor. Once it was established that stable vinyl cation intermediates can be attained through the solvolysis of vinyl compounds with good leaving groups like triflate and nonaflate and stabilized by electron-donating groups, a significant amount of progress as taken place and produced a field of stable vinyl cations.

One of the earliest vinyl cations studied had aryl substituents with an electron-donating moiety. Arylvinyl compounds are stabilized by resonance. Upon the removal of the leaving group, the empty p-orbital is perpendicular to the conjugated system of the phenyl ring, so it can only achieve resonance stabilization in its transition state when the vinyl empty p-orbital is coplanar with the p system of the phenyl ring. Adding steric bulk to the ortho-positions improve conjugation as it makes the phenyl ring orthogonal to the vinyl carbons but coplanar with the empty p-orbital.

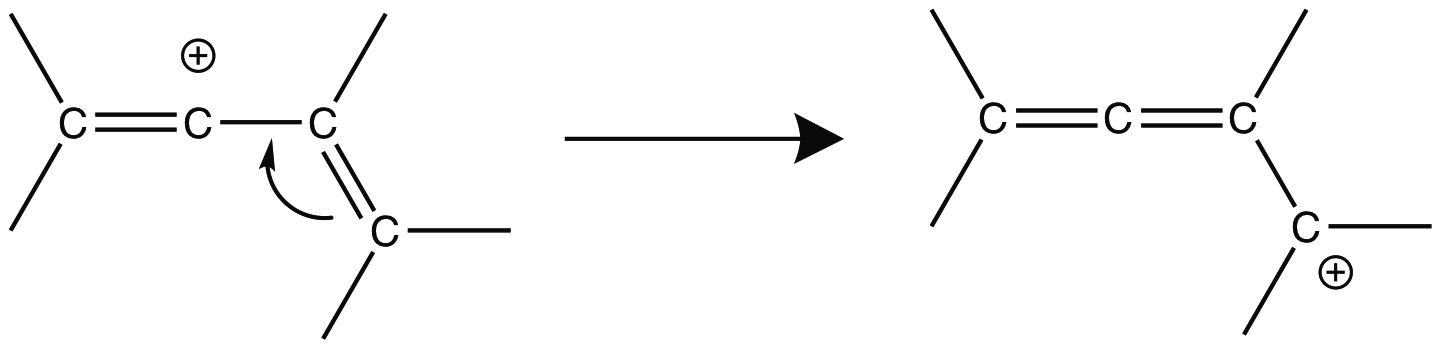
Electron conjugation in dienyl cation. Adapted from

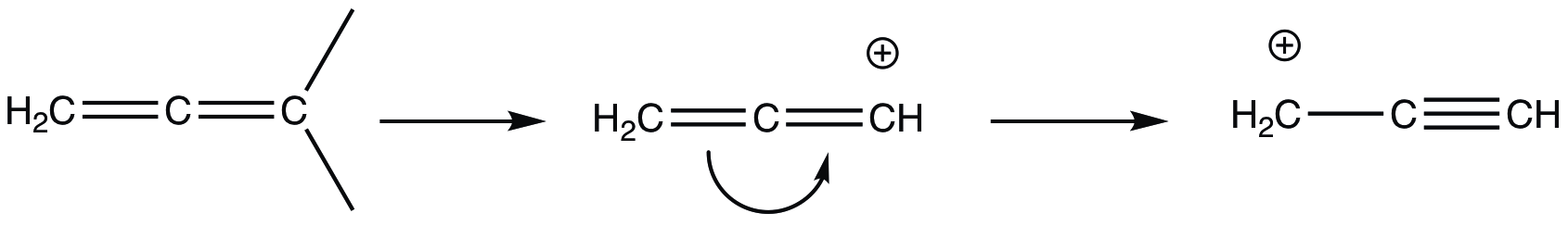
Electron conjugation in allenyl cation. Adapted from

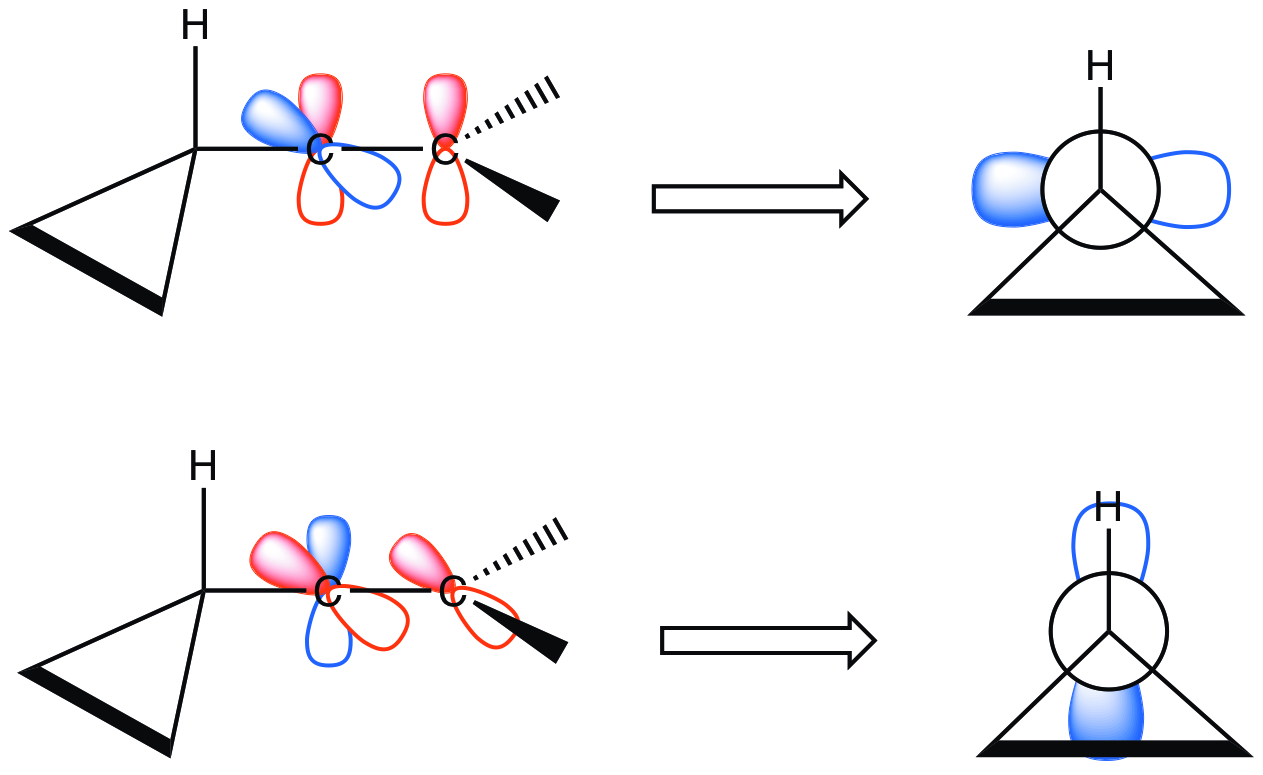
Structures of cyclopropyl vinyl cation. Top: bisected, bottom: perpendicular. Adapted from

Like arylvinyl cations, dienyl and allenyl cations are also stabilized by conjugation. Once again, double bonds in the conjugated system must be coplanar to the empty p-orbital to achieve resonance stabilization. In allenyl cations, the positive charge is well-distributed across the whole structure.

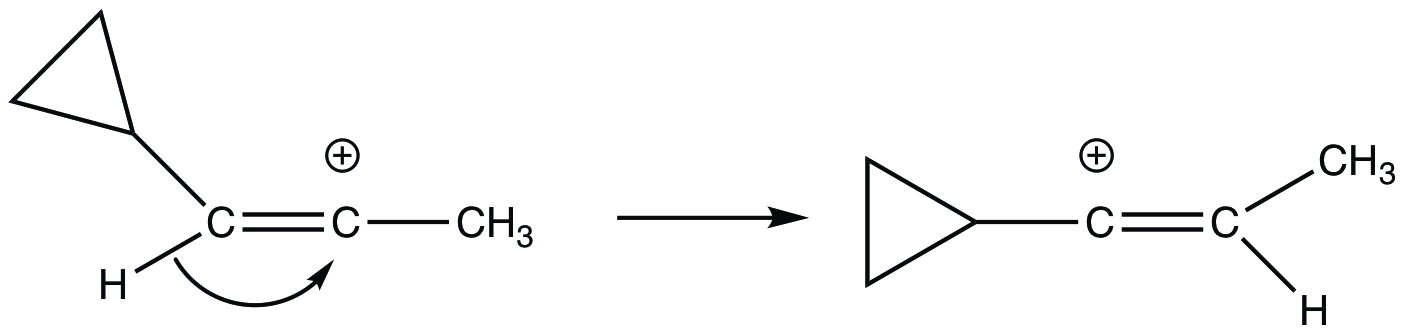
Rearrangement to cyclopropyl stabilized vinyl cation. Adapted from

Cyclopropylvinyl cations exhibit a non-classical approach to stabilization. When it is in its bisected structure, there is suitable overlap between its empty p-orbital and the cyclopropyl ring that stabilization is achieved. In its other form, the perpendicular structure, the empty p-orbital is perpendicular to the ring system. The stabilizing power of the cyclopropyl ring is so great that it has become a driving thermodynamic force in rearrangements like 1,2-hydride shifts in (E)- and (Z)-3-cyclopropyl-2-propenyl triflate solvolysis.

Substituent effects on vinyl cation stability

Substituent	Stabilization^{#}	Electronic effect from α-substituent		
Substituent	Stabilization^{#}	Induction^	π-donation	Hyperconjugation
-CH˭CH_{2}	+	-	+*	
-CH_{3}	+			+
-Cl	+	-	+*	
-Br	+	-	+*	
-I	+	-	+*	
-F	-	-*	+	
-NH_{2}	+	-	+*	
-OH	+	-	+*	
-SH	+	-	+*	
-C_{6}H_{5}	+		+*	
-CF_{3}	-	-		
-CH_{2}F	-	-		
-NO_{2}	-	-		
-C≡N	+	-	+*	
-CH_{2}Y***	+	-		+*
-Si(CH_{3})_{3}	+	+		
-C(O)H	-	+/-**		
-COOH	-	+/-**		
-C(CH_{3})_{2}OH	+	-		
-C≡CH	+	-	+*	

Table 1: Electronic effects responsible for stabilization of vinyl cation at the α-position

^ ‘-’ electron-withdrawing, ‘+’ electron-donating

^{#} ‘+’ indicates stabilization and ‘-‘ indicates destabilization of the substituted vinyl cation with respect to neutral alkene equivalent

*indicates the strongest factor responsible for (de)stabilization for substituents that exhibit more than one electronic effect

** the substituent is inductively withdrawing at the carbonyl carbon and also exhibits small electron delocalization from the carbonyl oxygen

*** Y = -F, -Cl, -Br, -I, -OH, -CN, -CF_{3}

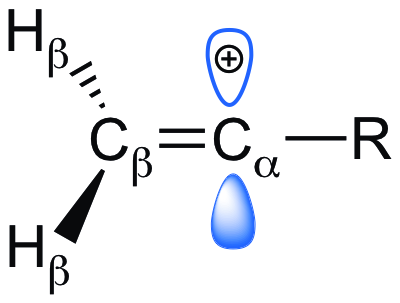
Labelling of simple vinyl cation.

The presence of an empty p-orbital perpendicular to the p-bond imparts unwanted destabilization onto the vinyl cation. This inherent instability can be diminished through favorable interactions with a-substituents that reduce the charge at the carbocation. Ab initio computational methods have been used to show stabilizing or destabilizing effects of substituents by monitoring changes in the enthalpies, bond lengths, bond order, and charges in the structures.

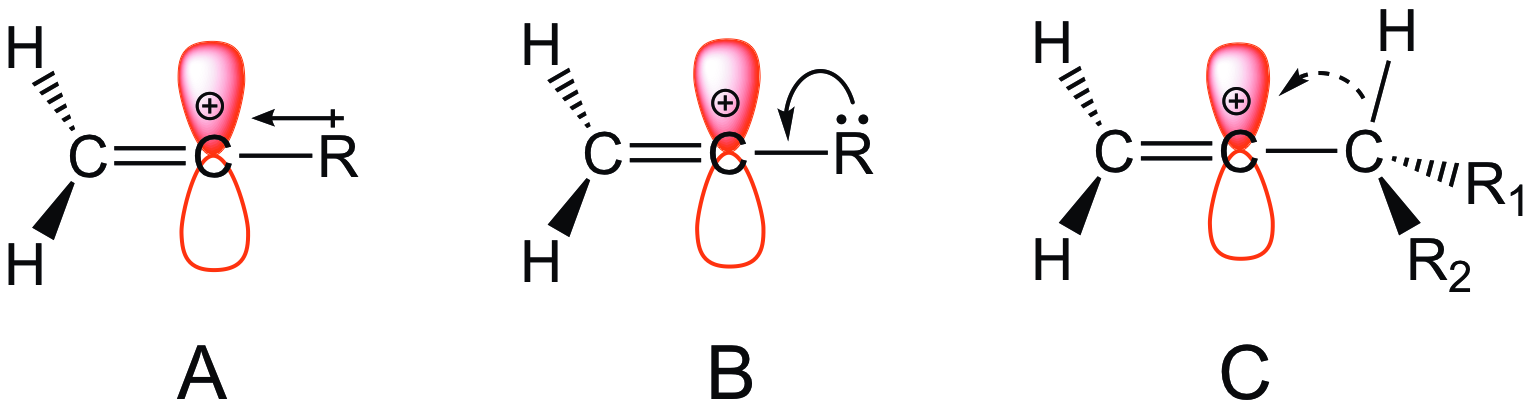
Electronic effects that stabilize vinyl cations.

There are three possible electronic effects that a substituent may exhibit to influence the stability of the vinyl cation. It may either destabilize the cation by drawing even more electron density from the carbon or stabilizing by contributing more electron density. The carbocation positive charge can be relieved by an unsaturated carbon-based or heteroatomic substituent through p-donation and/or C-H hyperconjugation by methylene/methyl substituents. In addition, inductive effects can either stabilize or destabilizing depending on whether the substituent is electron-donating or –withdrawing. Individual electronic effects are not isolable from the others as all three work together to influence the overall stability of the cation.

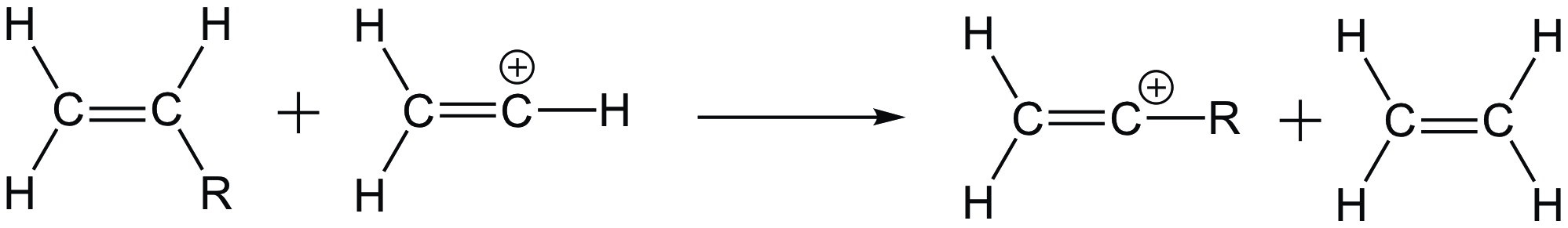
Isodesmic reaction typically used in energy calculations of vinyl cations.

For vinyl cations, relative stabilities can be compared with respect to their neutral alkene analogs. To obtain the stabilization properties of a-substituents, the isodesmic reaction was used to calculate enthalpy differences between the substituted vinyl cation and its neutral alkene precursor by getting its reaction enthalpy. This method is advantageous as it can be benchmarked against experimentally-determined thermochemical values. Calculations are initialized from the bridged, nonclassical structure of vinyl cations as it is the global minimum.

In a preliminary work, 4 substituents (-CH=CH_{2}, -F, -Cl, -CH_{3}) were initially studied to investigate electronic effects on vinyl cation stability. The a-substituents induce structural changes in the vinyl cation when compared to its neutral alkene counterpart. These changes can be attributed to the electronic effects present. In vinyl cations, there is a marked decrease in the C-R and C=C bond lengths, indicative of electron donation or induction between C_{a} and R, and C_{b} and C_{a}. On the other hand, the increase in the C_{b}-H bond length implies a strong hyperconjugative effect that is inversely related to the thermodynamic stability of the cation. Stabilization is possible because of a good overlap between the C-H bond and the empty p-orbital at C_{a}. Hyperconjugation is evident in all structures because of the adjacent C_{b}-H bond and in the –CH_{3} substituent.

Enthalpy calculations obtained from the isodesmic reaction are fair accurate and shows good correlation with experimental data. Stabilization is ranked the order, -F < -Cl < -CH_{3} < -CH=CH_{2}. All substituents impart stability except for fluorine which destabilized the vinyl cation by 7 kcal/mole. This phenomenon can be explained by comparing a-fluorine substituent effects on vinyl and ethyl cations. In ethyl cations, fluorine stabilizes the carbocation. The stark difference in the stabilizing capabilities of fluorine in the vinyl and ethyl cation is due to the difference in the hybridization of the a-carbons. Because the vinyl cation has a more electronegative sp-hybridized carbon, inductive effects will be more prominent. Having electronegative sp-hybridized carbon interact with fluorine significantly destabilizes the structure. This phenomenon is also apparent in a lesser extent when comparing –CH_{3} and –CH=CH_{2} substituents, where -CH=CH_{2} is less stabilizing.

Heteroatoms like fluorine and chlorine, can exhibit both inductive (electron-withdrawing) and p-donation electronic effects because of their high electronegativities and p-electrons. Stabilization then depends on the balance between the two electronic effects. For fluorine, destabilization via induction is dominant and resonance is significantly weaker. While for chlorine, resonance is sufficient to counteract induction so that overall the effect is stabilizing.

For inductively withdrawing/donating and p-donating substituents, some partial charges reside in the R group and C_{a}. Although the trend in charge magnitude in R and C_{a} for the four substituents are inversely related. It is also observed that there is an increase in the bond order of C_{b}=C_{a} and C_{a}-R, which is consistent with the corresponding changes in bond length.

In the small sample size of substituents, there was no observed correlation between bond order increase and charge distribution to R, and the stabilization due to the substituent. However, stabilization has exhibited a correlation to C_{b}-H bond elongation.

Based on the mechanisms provided above, a wide array of vinyl cation a-substituents can be classified according to the electronic effects they exhibit and the extent of stabilization would depend on the delicate balance between these effects.

Lone pair-containing substituents like –NH_{2}, -OH, and –SH are stabilizing since p-donation overcomes inductively withdrawing effects. Conjugated systems like –CH=CH_{2} and –C_{6}H_{5} are stabilizing due to strong p-donation. Highly destabilizing substituents like –CF_{3} and –NO_{2} only exhibit inductive electron withdrawal. Weakly destabilizing substituents like –CN has a weak p-donation effect that does not completely curb induction by electron withdrawal.

It is not entirely plausible to isolate the inductive effect of heteroatomic a-substituents because other electronic effects get in the way. However, one way inductive effects of functional groups can be investigated is by probing b-substituent effects where the heteroatom would be a methylene group away from the vinyl cation (-CH_{2}Y). In –CH_{2}Y groups that exhibit a very small or no p donation, there is only a very small difference in the hyperconjugative effect in the –CH_{2}- groups of the substituents. Hence, the overall stability can be correlated to the b-substituent effect, now only driven by its inductive power. Comparing only purely inductively capabilities of functional groups the order is: CN > CF_{3} > F > Cl > Br > OH, with some destabilization energies comparable to a methyl group.

In most cases, substituents exhibit more than one electronic (de)stabilization effect. Usually, the inductive effect brought upon by multiple bonds to a heteroatom can be counterbalanced by p donation from the same heteroatom. For instance, based on absolute b-inductive power, -CN is more inductive than CF_{3}, but since there can be p donation from the nitrogen of CN, its inductive capability is reduced. In common heteroatomic substituents like F, Cl, Br, and OH, the stabilization decreases with higher electron-withdrawing ability. However, p donation is still believed to take place because of C-R bond decrease.

Carbonyl substituents are mainly destabilizing because of the highly partially positive carbonyl carbon beside the vinyl cation and no p donation.

It is useful to compare substituent effects of vinyl cations and ethyl cations to investigate the hybridization effects of stabilization. In general, vinyl cations are more stabilized by substituents compared ethyl cations primarily because vinyl cations are inherently less stable to begin with. For strongly inductively electron-withdrawing groups like –F, -OH, and –NH_{2}, inductive destabilization is more apparent in vinyl compared to ethyl cations because of the highly electronegative nature of vinyl cation sp hybrids compared to ethyl cation sp^{2} hybrids. In contrast, in the case of an α-Si(CH_{3})_{3} substituent, it is more stabilizing to vinyl cations because it has no p-electrons.

In terms of bond order, stabilizing substituents result in an increase in the C-R, C_{α}=C_{β}, and C_{β}-H bond orders. Small increases in bond orders are observed in –CF_{3}, -CH_{2}F, and –CH_{2}X, where they are incapable of p donation, while large increases in bond orders are observed in substituents that can donate p or p electrons like –CH=CH_{2}, -I, or –SH.

== Vinyl cation intermediates in chemical reactions ==
=== Electrophilic additions ===
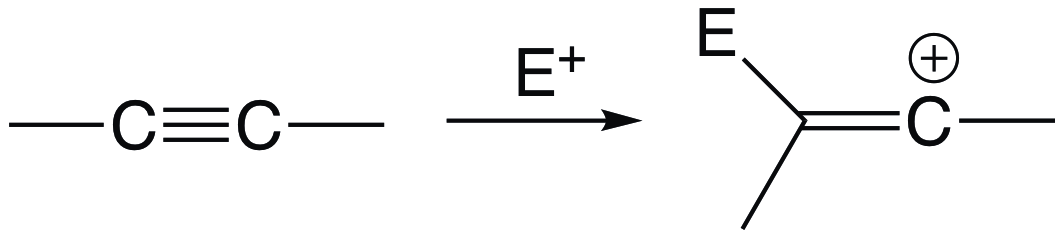
General scheme for electrophilic attack on acetylene. Adapted from

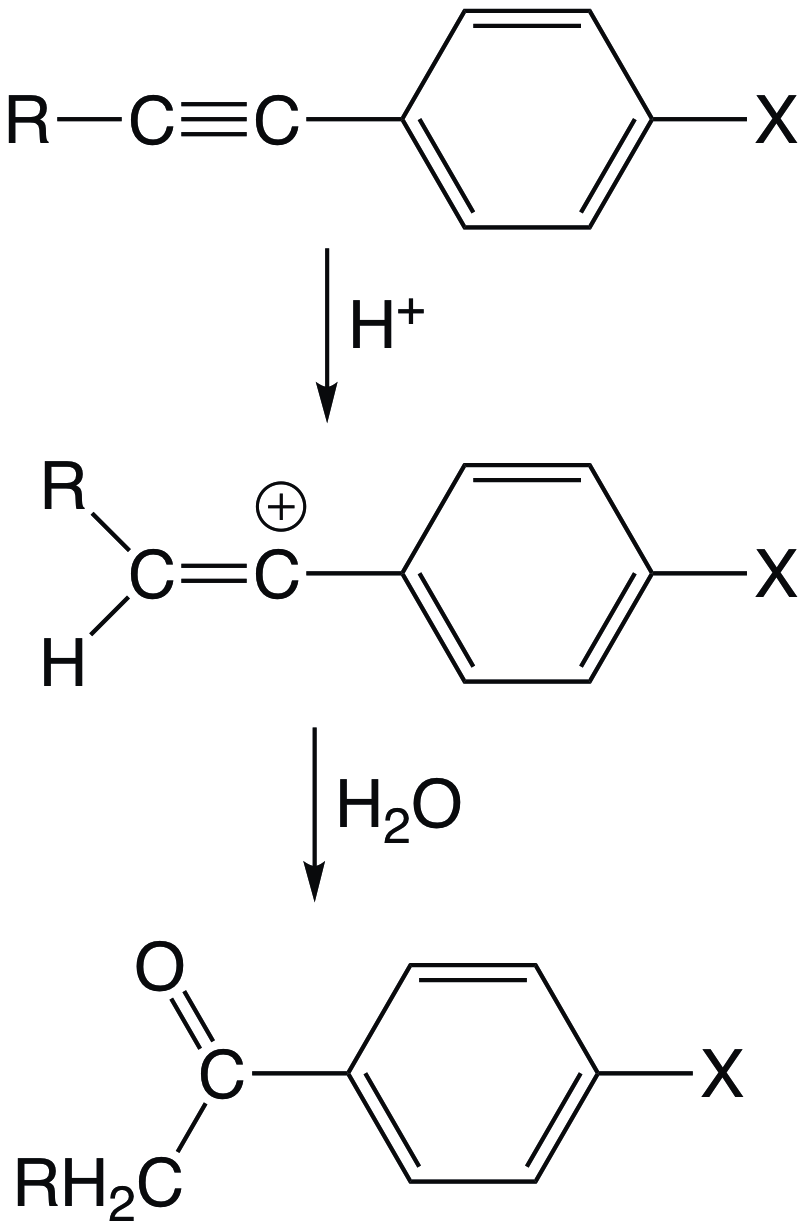
Acid-catalyzed hydration of alkynes through vinyl cation intermediate. Adapted from

A vinyl cation intermediate is possibly formed when electrophilic moieties attack unsaturated carbons. This can be achieved in the reaction of electrophiles with alkynes or allenes. In these reactions, a positive electrophile attacks one of the unsaturated carbons that then forms a vinyl cation, which subsequently undergoes further reaction steps to form the final product.

In the acid-catalyzed hydration of arylacetylene derivatives, a proton initially attacks the triple bond to form a vinyl cation at the aryl substituted carbon. The intermediate experiences little resonance stabilization because of the orthogonality of the conjugated aryl orbital with the empty p-orbital of the vinyl cation. The reaction is first order with respect to both the acetylene and the proton and with the protonation of the acetylene as the rate-determining step. Monosubstituted aryl/alkoxyacetylenes exhibit faster kinetics in acidic hydrations compared to its methyl-substituted equivalents. In arylacetylenes, methyl groups appear to contribute less stabilization compared to hydrogens because of C-H hyperconjugation, reversing the stabilization trend observed in alkyl cations. C-H hyperconjugation is a significant factor because the C-H bond can significantly overlap with the vacant p-orbital. Another possible explanation is that smaller size of the hydrogen substituent allows solvation to take place more easily contributing more significant stabilization.

Aside from protons, other electrophilic groups can attack an acetylene moiety. When attacked by carboxylic acids, cis/trans alkene adducts may be formed. The reaction with hydrogen halides, which also has an initial protonation step, results in the formation of halo-substituted alkenes. Lastly, adamantyl ketones may be formed from an adamantyl cation attack on acetylene and subsequent hydration.

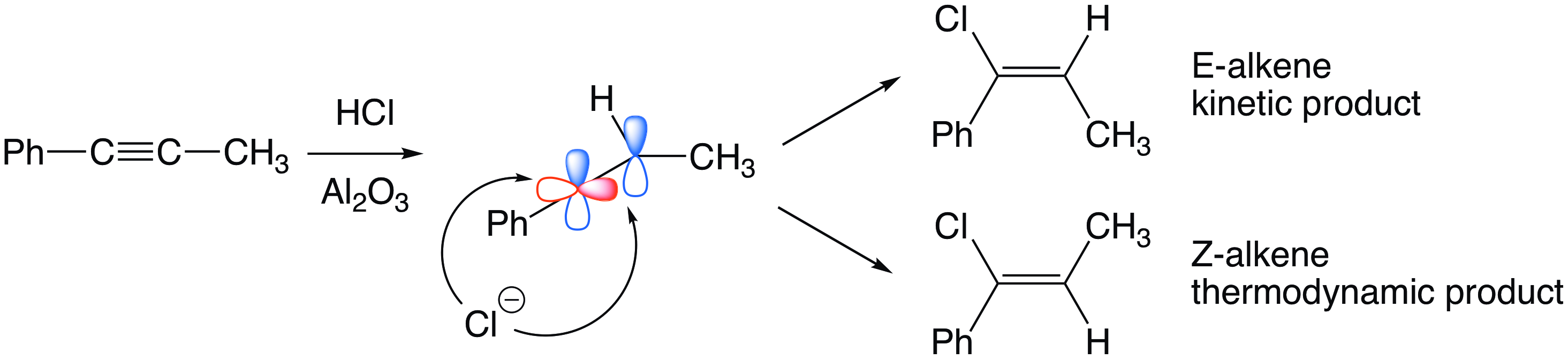
Thermodynamic and kinetic controlled products of hydrohalogenation of alkynes through vinyl cation intermediate. Adapted from

In the hydrohalogenation of phenylpropene, two distinct alkene products are formed because of thermodynamic and kinetic effects. The linear sp-hybridized vinyl cation may be attacked by the halogen from two directions. When attacked from the less sterically hindered side (hydrogen), the E-alkene is produced, attack to the other side forms the Z-alkene. Over short time scales, the E-alkene is favored because the attack from the less bulky side is preferred, but over longer times, the more stable (bulky methyl and phenyl groups on opposite sides) Z-alkene is preferred. Though the E-alkene is initially formed, it isomerizes to the Z-alkene through a carbocation intermediate the stems from protonation and C-C rotation steps.

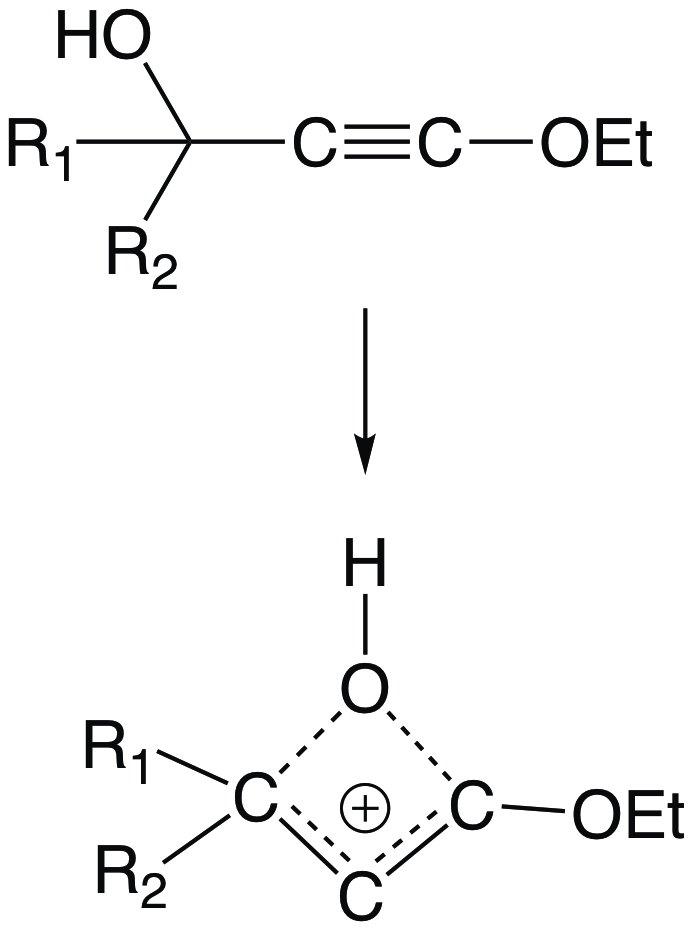
Hydroxyl neighboring group effect on vinyl cations. Adapted from

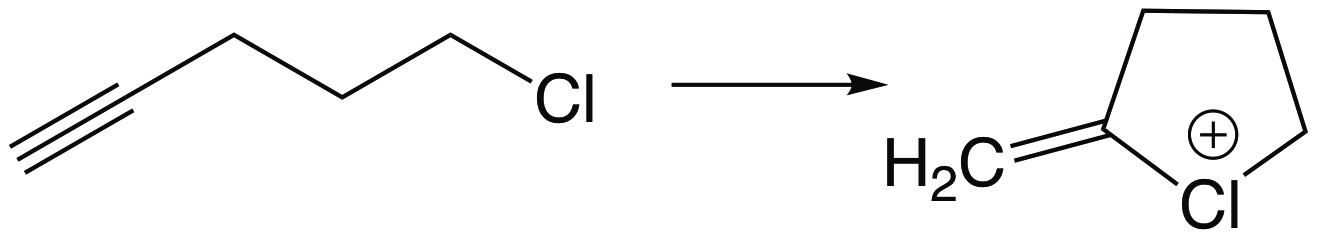
Terminal chlorine neighboring group effect on 1-pentyne. Adapted from

Neighboring groups surround the alkyne can enhance reaction kinetics by interacting with the intermediate via nonclassical approaches like intramolecular interactions. An alkyne that is adjacent to a tertiary alcohol forms a four-membered cyclic vinyl cation intermediate in which the oxygen of the hydroxyl group bridges two carbons across two bonds. Likewise, a five-membered chloronium ring intermediate is formed from 5-chloro substituted 1-pentynes. An unusually shifted product is formed because the intermediate undergoes heterolysis at the C_{5}-Cl position.

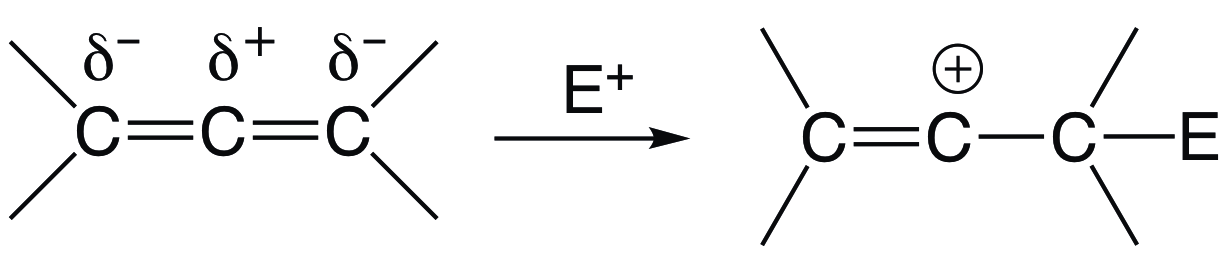
Electrophilic attack to allene groups. Adapted from

In the electrophilic attack of allenes, it takes place in a manner that prefers to form a terminal adduct and the vinyl cation at the central carbon. The polarization of the allene group show that the terminal carbons have a higher electron density and tendency to under nucleophilic attack. However, if the terminal end is stabilized by a substituent, an allyl-like cation may form as the electrophile attacks the central carbon. Similar to phenyl rings adjacent to vinyl cations, there must be bond rotation to achieve complete resonance stabilization.

=== Rearrangements ===
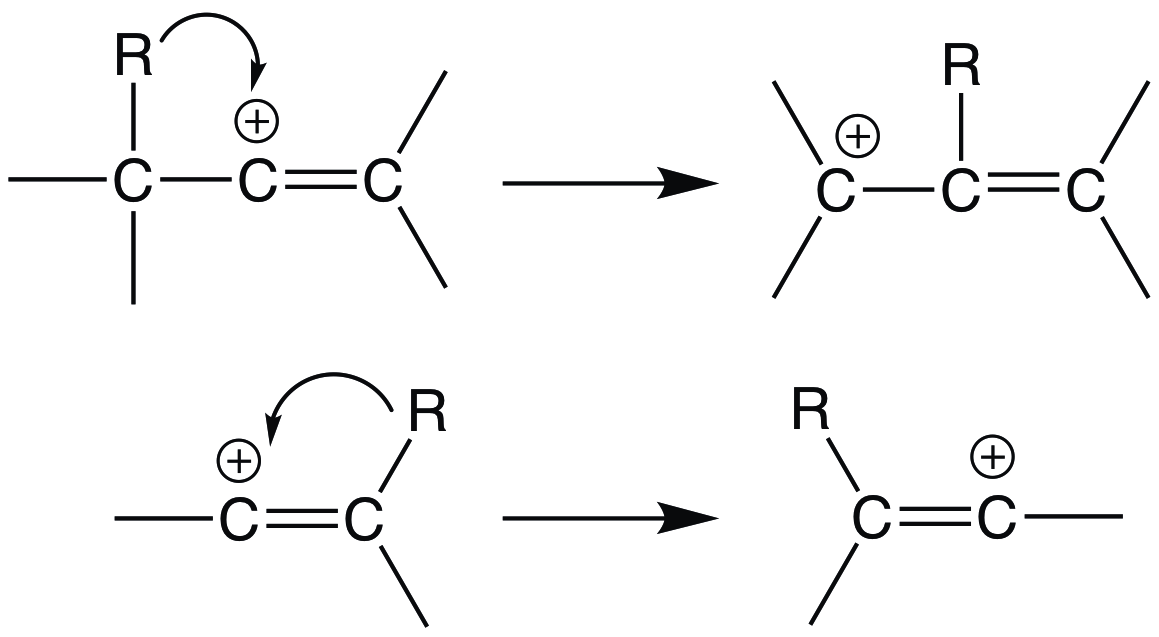
Major types of rearrangements in vinyl cations. Adapted from

Vinyl cations tend to rearrange. These rearrangements can be broadly categorized into two classes: migrations into double bonds and rearrangements via the double bonds. The first category involves 1,2-shifts that lead to the formation of an allyl cation, while the second type involves the formation of another vinyl cation isomer.

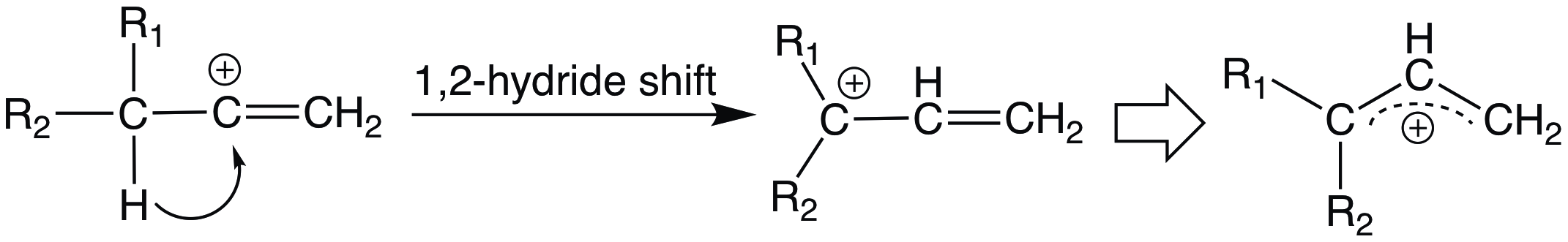
1,2-Hydride shift in vinyl cation. Adapted from

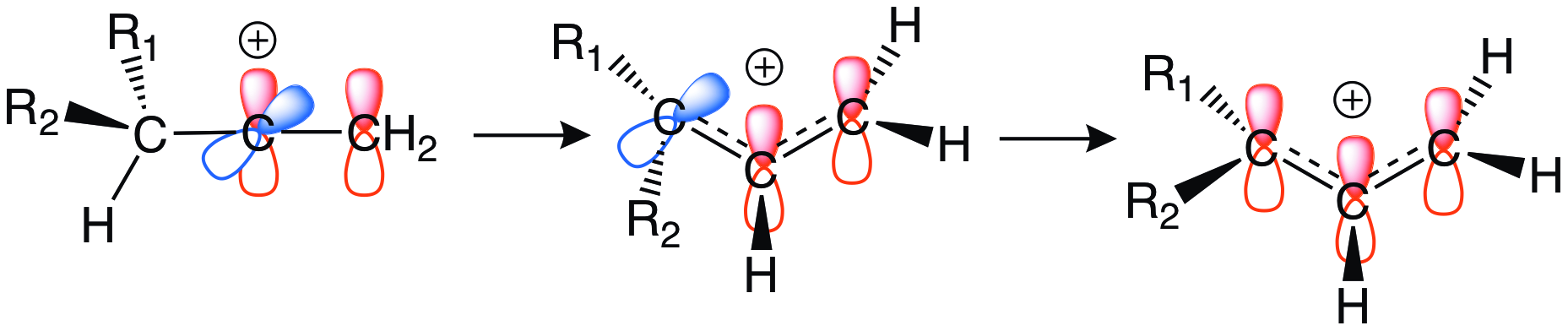
Orbital interactions in vinyl cation to allyl cation rearrangement. Adapted from

Vinyl cations undergo 1,2-hydride shifts to form an allyl-stabilized cation. 1,2-Hydride shifts are fairly common in alkyl cations and is fast in the NMR time scale. However, in vinyl cations, this rearrangement is uncommon even though the rearrangement product in thermodynamically stable. Much like the aryl-substituted vinyl cations, the interacting orbitals during the conversion of a linear vinyl cation to a non-linear allyl cation are orthogonal and passes through a non-planar transition state, which makes the rearrangement difficult. This is evident in the higher activation energies of 1,2-hydride shifts in vinyl cations compared to alkyl cations. Examples of reactions in which this is observed would be the protonation of dialkyl-substituted alkynes and in the solvolysis of ispropylvinyl trifluromethanesulfonate in trifluoroethanol.

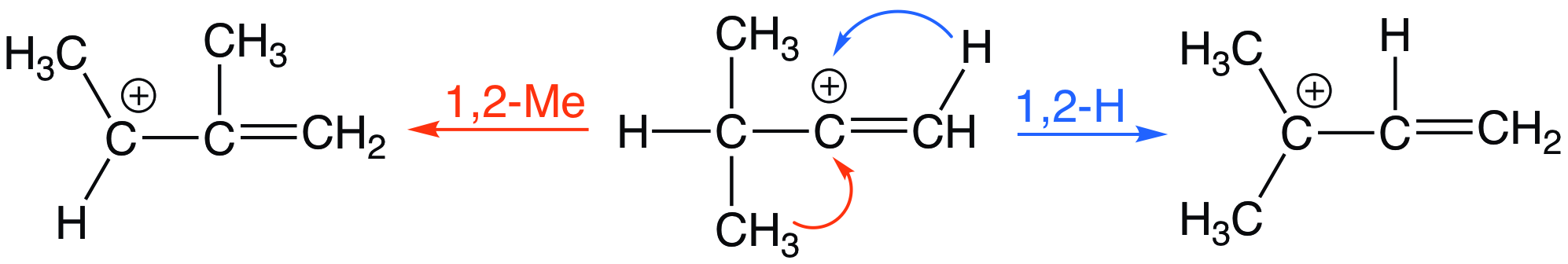
1,2-Methyl and 1,2-hydride shift in the same vinyl cation. Adapted from

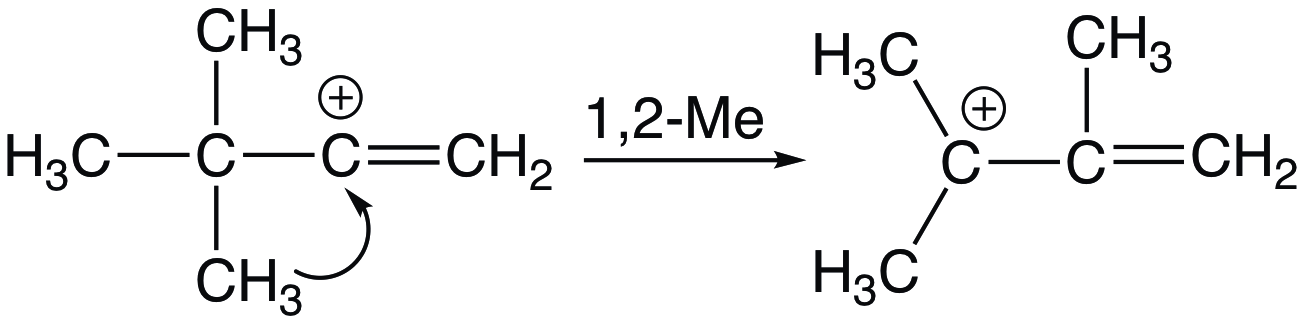
1,2-methyl shift in tert-butyl substituted vinyl cation. Adapted from

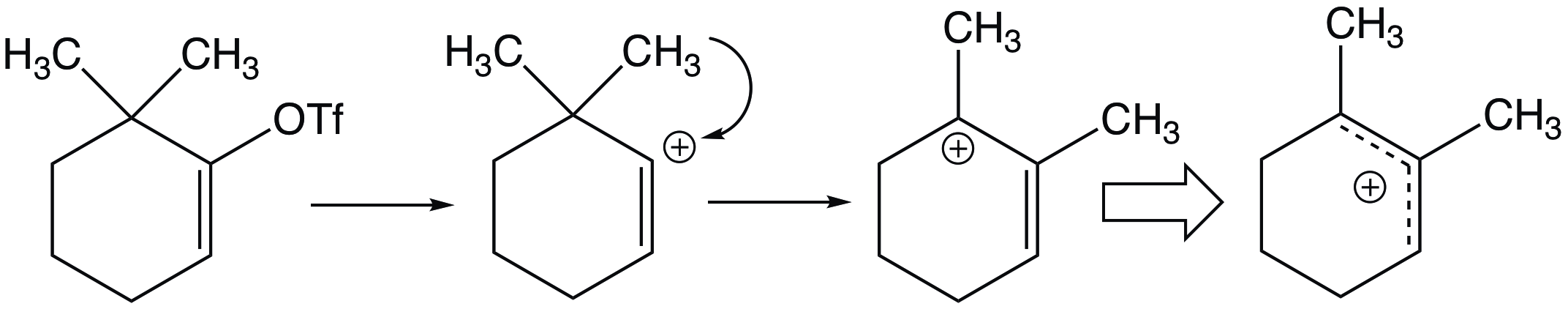
1,2-methyl shift in cyclic vinyl cation. Adapted from

1,2-Methyl shifts also occur in vinyl cations, and like 1,2-hydride shifts, they have higher activation barriers compared to their alkyl cation equivalents. In the protonation of alkynes, both 1,2-hydride and 1,2-methyl shifts may take place. The preference depends on the alkyl substituent since it will dictate the resulting allyl cation product. For t-butyl substituents, 1,2-methyl shifts are preferred, and for isopropyl substituents, 1,2-hydride shifts occur instead. Cyclic alkenes also exhibit 1,2-methyl shifts upon solvolysis.

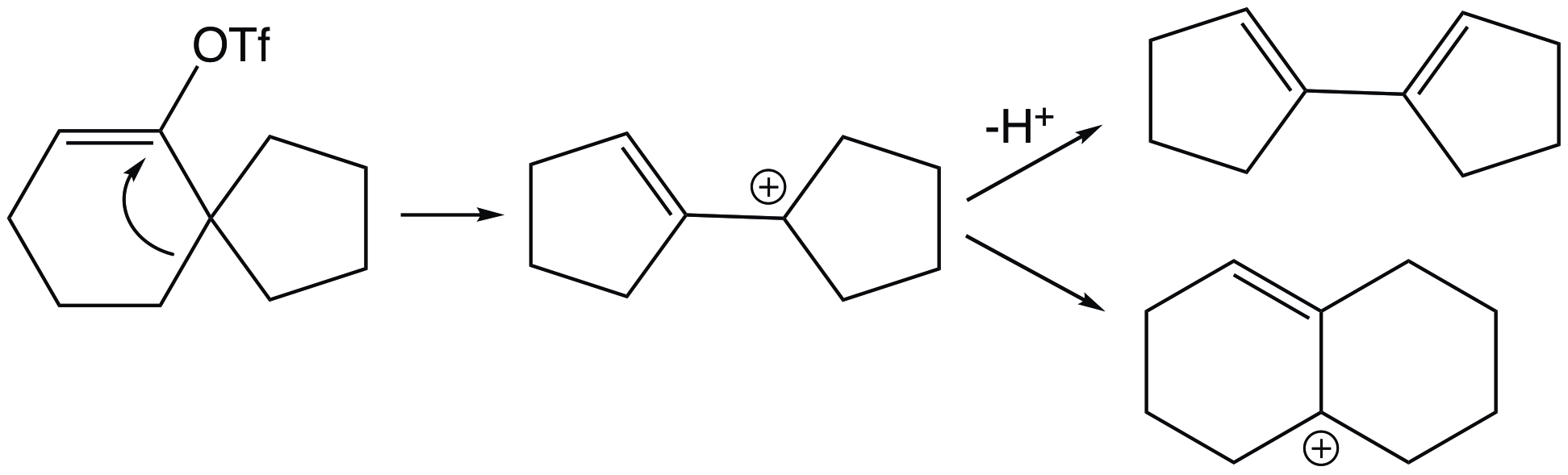
Alkyl shifts in vinyl cation that leads to changes in cyclic system. Adapted from

In the solvolysis of spiro-vinyl triflate, the formation of a vinyl cation intermediate through a concerted process drives further rearrangements that involve the formation of a completely distinct cyclic structure. Ring expansion can also be achieved through the rearrangement of a vinyl cation.

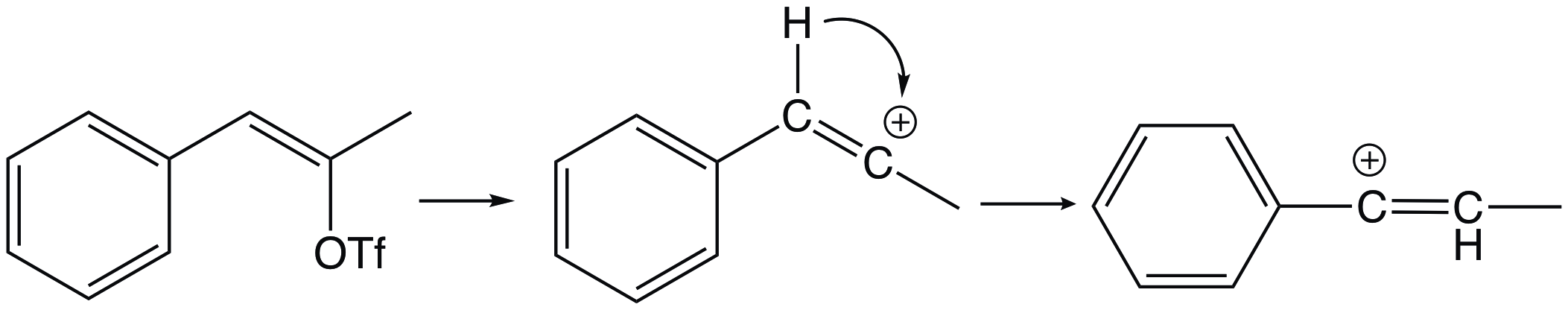
1,2-hydride shift in vinyl cation to form another vinyl cation isomer. Adapted from

The second class of rearrangements, the vinyl cation rearranges to form another vinyl cation isomer. The process is highly dependent on the solvent, nature of the nucleophile, and moieties in the compound. In primary vinyl cations, a 1,2-hydride is unlikely because of the low stability of the primary vinyl cation because of the low electron-donating capability of hydrogen. However, this is still observed in special cases like in 1-methyl-2-phenylvinyl triflate, where the resulting vinyl cation is resonance-stabilized.

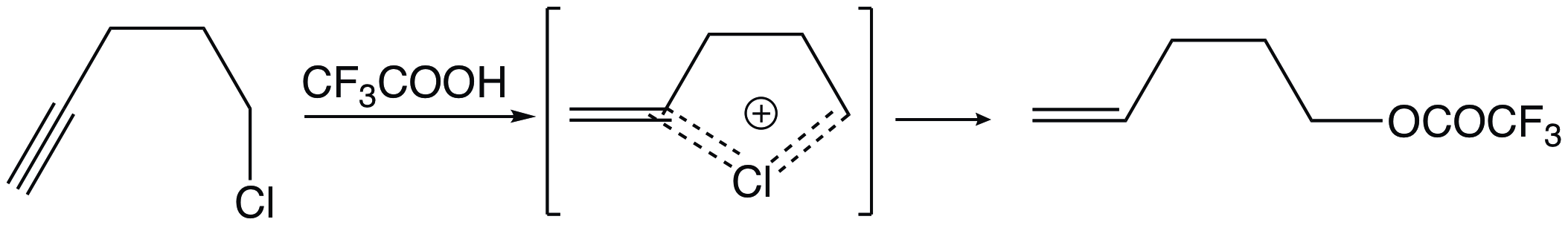
Halogen shift in vinyl cation. Adapted from

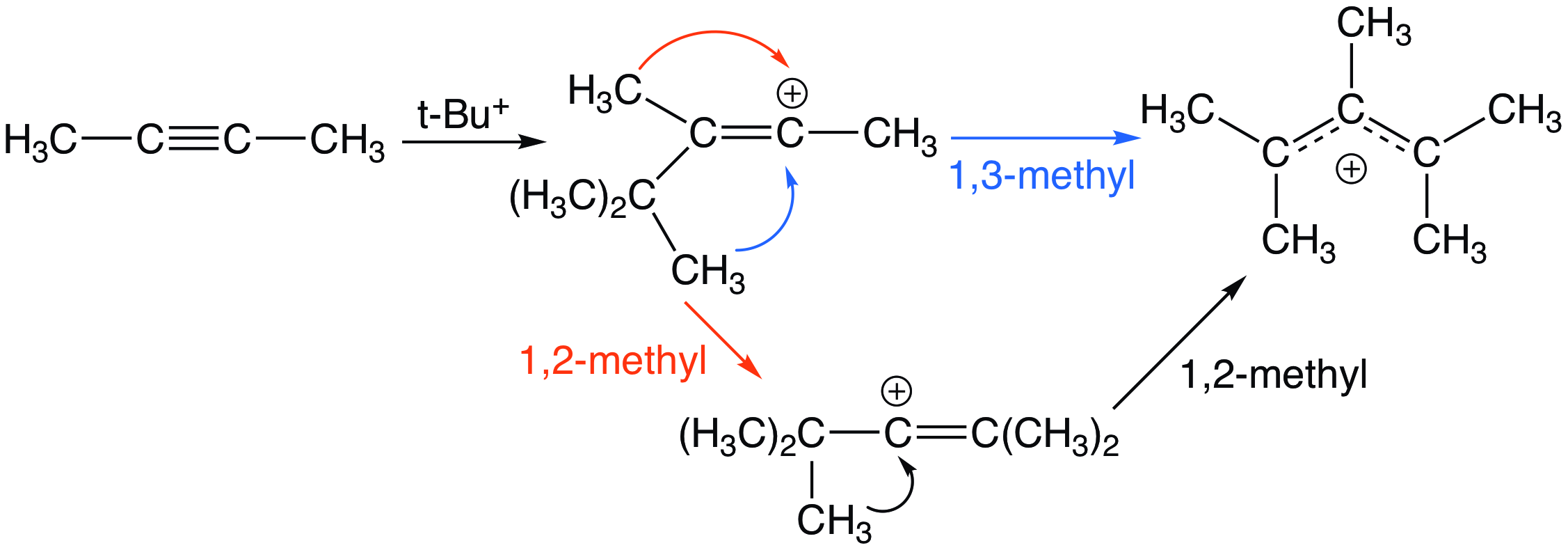
Methyl shifts to the vinyl cation. Adapted from

Methyl shifts are observed in the addition of tert-butyl cation to but-2-yne. The pentaallyl cation that is formed could be the result of a single 1,3-methyl shift or two consecutive 1,2-methyl shifts. Rearrangement via the double bond could also change the size of a cyclic system. In the solvolysis of methyl-substituted cyclohexenyl triflate, the rearrangement and non-rearranged product are formed in almost equal amounts, with a small preference to the rearrangement product because of its linear structure. However, there is some strain in the methylenecyclopentane rearrangement product.

Lastly, halogens could also move into and stabilize a vinyl cation system. In the reaction of 5-chloropent-1-yne with trifluoroacetic acid, there is simultaneous protonation and 1,4-shift of chlorine that forms a bridged cyclic structure across four carbons. Trifluoroacetic acid subsequently attacks the intermediate from the terminal end to form 2-chloropent-4-enyl trifluoroacetate. This phenomenon is also observed in other halogens. For instance, fluoroalkynes can form a product with two adducts.

=== Vinyl cations in pericyclic reactions ===
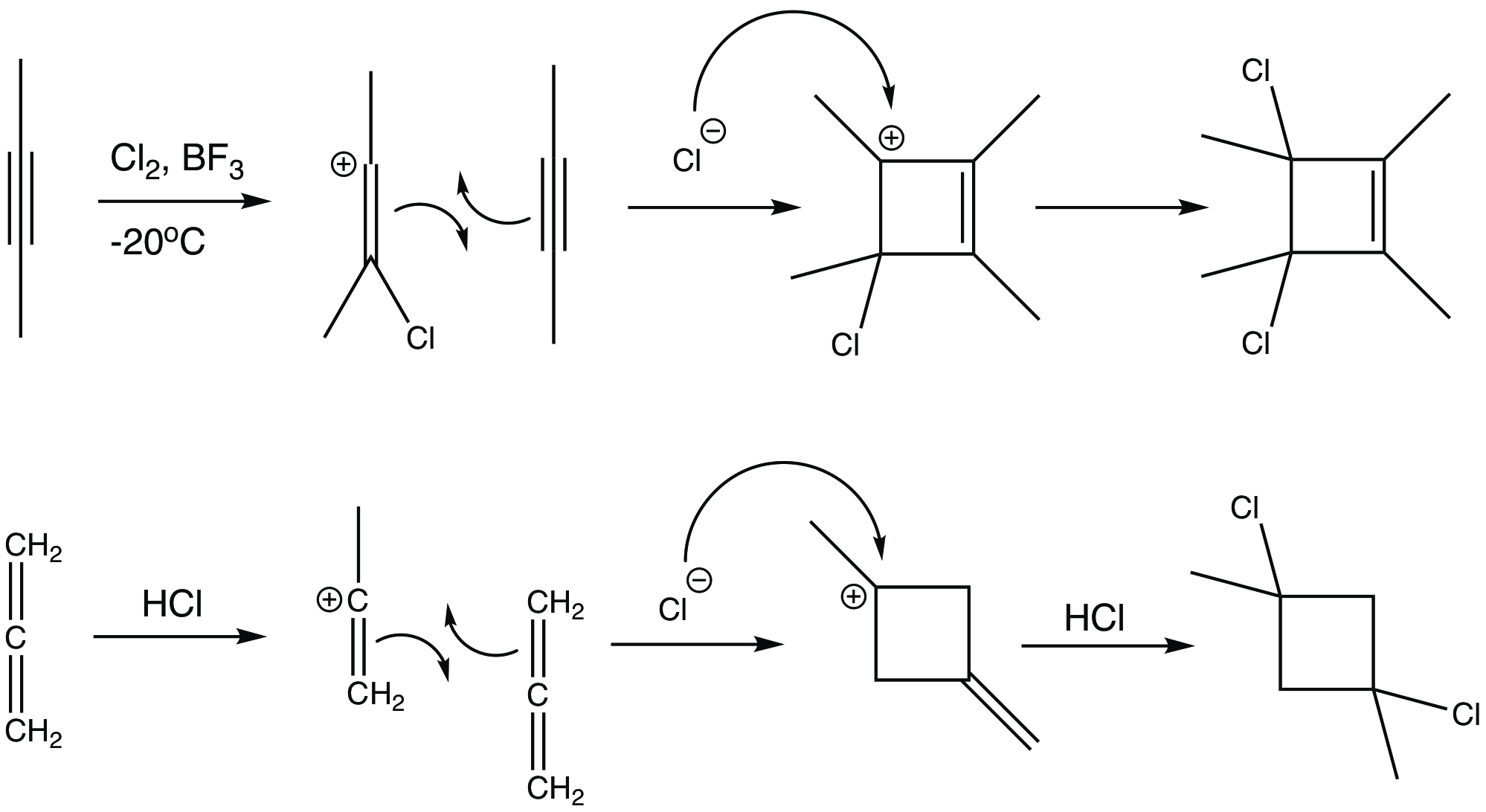
Vinyl cation intermediates in pericyclic reactions. Adapted from

Ketenes and allenes undergo [2+2] cycloadditions under thermal conditions in a concerted manner because they have pi orbitals that are orthogonal to each other. Vinyl cation intermediates undergo the same process in the same manner because it has 2 p orbitals that can simultaneously overlap with the orbitals of the dienophile. In the Smirnov-Zamkow reaction between 2-butyne and Cl_{2}, a cycloaddition leads to the formation of dichlorocyclobutane. A similar reaction is also observed when allene is reacted with HCl. After the cycloaddition, a cationic cyclic intermediate is formed and then it is attacked by a nucleophile to form the final product.

=== Vinyl cations in hydrohalogenation ===
There is debate on whether a vinyl cation intermediate forms with the addition of a halide (H-X) compound to a terminal alkyne for hydrohalogenation reactions. Alternatively, some believe that the addition of H and Br in this case is actually concerted.
