= Andrée Marlière =

Belgian ballet dancer (1934–2008)

- Born: Andrée Isabelle Germaine Marlier; 22 February 1934; Antwerp
- Died: 10 January 2008 (aged 73); Wilrijk, St-Augustinus hospital
- Occupation: Ballet dancer

Andrée Marlière (born Andrée Isabelle Germaine Marlier, Antwerp 22 February 1934 – Wilrijk, St-Augustinus hospital 10 January 2008) was a Belgian ballet dancer and painter.

== Ballet education ==
She started her ballet education at the age of eight with Monique Querida, danseuse étoile at the Monnaie Theatre in Brussels, and with Mina Del Fa, soliste at the Scala of Milan. Perfection courses were followed with Victor Gsovsky and Madame Rousanne (Rousanne Sarkissian) in Paris. From 1948 to 1950 she took classes at the Sadler's Wells Ballet School in London with John Field and Ninette de Valois.

== Ballet career ==
At the age of 12 she performed with André Leclair at the Gala Querida in the Palais des Beaux Arts in Brussels. In 1950 she performed in Florence with the Maggio Musicale Florentino. From 1950 to 1951 she was part of the corps de ballet of the Théatre de la Monnaie and from 1951 to 1957 she was soliste at the Koninklijke Vlaamse Opera in Antwerp.

In 1957 she left for Berlin. This was the beginning of her international career which led her to:

- the Berliner Ballet (first dancer, 1957–1958),
- the Jean Babilée company (first soliste, 1958–1959),
- the Grand Ballet du Marquis de Cuevas (soliste, 1959),
- The Ballet de la Monnaie and the Ballet du XXième Siecle (first soliste, 1959–1964)
- and the ballet group of the Deutsche Oper am Rhein in Düsseldorf (danseuse étoile, 1964–1966).

With these companies she did several international tours. In 1966 she returned to Antwerp to the Royal Flemish Opera Ballet (danseuse étoile, 1966–1970). To conclude her performing dancing career she was active for one season as danseuse étoile for the Ballet van Vlaanderen (1970–1971).

She did several television appearances.

== Performances ==
Andrée Marlière performed in the following ballets during her international career: Ballet – Choreographer – Composer

=== Royal Flemish Opera (1951–1957) ===
- Namouna (Suite en Blanc) – Jacques Milliand – Édouard Lalo
- Chout – Jacques Milliand – Sergei Prokofiev
- De duivel in het dorp – Jacques Milliand – Fran Lotka
- Vlaamse dansen – Jeanne Brabants – Jan Blockx
- Judith – Jacques Milliand – Renier van der Velden
- Serenade – Jacques Milliand – Pyotr Ilyich Tchaikovsky
- De Vuurvogel – Jacques Milliand – Igor Stravinsky

and in several operas: Gounod's Faust, Bizet's Carmen, Borodin's Prince Igor

=== Berliner Ballet (1957–1959) ===
- Hamlet – Tatjana Gsovsky – Boris Blacher
- Kapittel IV – Tatjana Gsovsky – Peter Sandhoff
- Orpheo – Tatjana Gsovsky – Franz Liszt
- Variaciones Sinfonicas – Tatjana Gsovsky – Robert Schumann
- Joan de Zarissa – Tatjana Gsovsky – Werner Egk
- Rigoletto – Sana Dolsky – Verdi & Liszt
- Kleiner Sketch – Pépé Urbani – Darius Milhaud
- La dame aux camélias (replacing Yvette Chauviré) – Tatjana Gsovsky – Henry Sauget

=== Ballet Jean Babilée (1958–1959) ===
- La boucle – Jean Babilée – Georges Delerue
- L'oiseau Bleu – Marius Petipa – Pyotr Ilyich Tchaikovsky
- Printemps – Ives Brieux – Alexander Glazunov
- Namouna (Suite en blanc) – Serge Lifar – Édouard Lalo
- Balance à trois – Jean Babilée – Jean-Michel Damase
- Balletino – Dick Sanders – Jacques Ibert

=== Grand Ballet du Marquis de Cuevas ===
The classical repertoire

=== Ballet of the 20th Century (1959–1964) ===
- Tales of Hoffmann – Maurice Béjart – Jacques Offenbach
- Jeux de cartes – Janine Charrat – Igor Stravinsky
- Pulcinella – Maurice Béjart – Igor Stravinsky
- Les 4 fils Aymon – Maurice Béjart – Ancient music
- Haut voltage – Maurice Béjart – Jean-Michel Damase
- Concerto – Janine Charrat – Sergei Prokofiev
- Orphée – Maurice Béjart – Pierre Henry
- Divertimento – Maurice Béjart – Percussion arrangement
- Bartok Suite – Milko Sparemblek – Bela Bartok
- Demonstration – Assaf Messerer – Classmusic
- La Péri – Jean-Jacques Etchevery – Paul Dukas
- Such a sweet Thunder – Maurice Béjart – Duke Ellington

=== Deutsche Oper am Rhein (1964–1966) ===
De Vuurvogel – Erich Walter – Igor Stravinsky
Bach Suite – Erich Walter – J-S. Bach
Petroushka – Erich Walter – Igor Stravinsky

=== Royal Flemish Opera (1966–1970) ===
- Cinderella – André Leclair – Sergei Prokofiev
- De twee duiven – André Leclair – André Messager
- Ode – André Leclair – Igor Stravinsky
- Pierlala – Jeanne Brabants – Daniël Sternefeld
- Pelleas en Melisande – André Leclair – Arnold Schönberg
- Concerto di Aranjuez – André Leclair – Joaquin Rodrigo
- Orfeus – André Leclair – C. W. Gluck
- Hamlet – André Leclair – Boris Blacher
- Effecten – André Leclair – François Glorieux
- De fantastische jacht – André Leclair – Raymond Baervoets
- La Peri – André Leclair – Paul Dukas
- Op zoek naar ... – André Leclair – Louis de Meester

=== Royal Ballet of Flanders (1971) ===
- Love Scene – Maurice Béjart – Hector Berlioz

== Instructor ==
After her dancing career she continued as instructor specialised in rebuilding and rehearsing choreographies: (Cage of God, Pas de Six, Opus een, Ain Dor, Allegro Brillante, Kaleidoscoop, After Eden, Brandenburg drie, Cantus Firmus, Dialogue, Peter and the Wolf, Carmina Burana, Sylvia, The three musketeers, ...)

In 1964 she was hired as Classical Repertoire teacher in the Ballet School of the city of Antwerp. 1970 starts her career with the Ballet of Flandres (Koninklijk Ballet van Vlaanderen) where she becomes first 'Maitresse de ballet' and is part of management.

At the Badisches Staatstheater of Karlsruhe (Germany) she is 'Maitresse de ballet' from 1984 to 1989. From 1989 on she is repertoire teacher at the Antwerp Ballet school.

== Coaching ==
As a coach Andrée Marlière has had the opportunity to be requested by several choreographers to rebuild and rehearse their ballets with different ballet companies. She studied every dancer's part in the ballet and saw to it that they would be instructed how to perform according to the choreographers expectations. Her expertise in this matter offered her the opportunity to work with multiple ballet companies.

She has rebuilt and rehearsed the following ballets:

Cage of God – J. Carter – Royal Ballet of Flanders
Pas de Six – Bournonville – Royal Ballet of Flanders
Opus een – Kranko – Royal Ballet of Flanders
Ain Dor – Effrati – Royal Ballet of Flanders
Allegro Brillante – Balanchine – Royal Ballet of Flanders
Kaleidoscoop – John Butler – Royal Ballet of Flanders
After Eden – John Butler – Royal Ballet of Flanders
Brandenburger drie – Tscharny – Royal Ballet of Flanders
Cantus Firmus – Jeanne Brabants – Royal Ballet of Flanders
Dialogue – Jeanne Brabants – Royal Ballet of Flanders
Peter and the Wolf – Germinal Casado – Badische Staatsoper Karlsruhe
Carmina Burana – Germinal Casado – Badische Staatsoper Karlsruhe
Sylvia – Germinal Casado – Lodz, Poland
The three musketeers – Germinal Casado – Toulouse, France
Songe d'une nuit d'été – Germinal Casado – Athens, Greece
Whimsicalities – Nils Christe – Conservatoire de la danse, Paris
Cantus – Jeanne Brabants – Antwerp Ballet School
Salvé Antwerpia – Jeanne Brabants – Antwerp Ballet School
Bal des Cadets – after Fokine – Antwerp Ballet School
Paquita after – Marius Petipa – Antwerp Ballet School

== Choreographies ==
Twee harten in driekwartsmaat – Jef Maes – 1967 – Koninklijke Vlaamse Opera
Nacht in Venetië – Johann Strauss – 1968 – Koninklijke Vlaamse Opera
Etudes – Robert Stolz – 1970 – Koninklijke Vlaamse Opera
Auftrag – Schostakovitz – 1985 – Badische Staatsoper Karlsruhe
Fanfare – 1992 – Antwerp Ballet School
Dances Roumaines – Romanian Folk music – 1994 – Antwerp Ballet School
Oiseau de Feu – Stravinsky – 2000 – Antwerp Ballet School

== Today ==
In her last years, she retired from the active ballet world and devoted her time to her second passion, paintings.

== Sources ==
- "The Art of Andrée Marlière".
