= Mount Andree =

Mountain on Heard Island

Mount Andree (53°2′S 73°22′E) is an ice-free hill, 140 m, surmounting the small headland between Cave and West Bays on the west side of Heard Island. First charted and named by Edgar Aubert de la Rue, French geologist aboard the whale humper Kildalkey, who with his wife Andree undertook geological investigations along the north and west sides of the island in January 1929. The feature was determined to form part of a dissected volcanic crater by the British Australian New Zealand Antarctic Research Expedition (BANZARE), under Mawson, which visited the area in November 1929 and applied the name Cave Bay Hill. The approved name, a shortened form of Mont Andree de la Rue, was recommended by Antarctic Names Committee of Australia (ANCA) in 1954.
