= John Andree (physician) =

British physician (1699–1785)

John Andree (1699? – 4 February 1785) was a British physician.

Andree's place of birth is unknown. He was M.D. Rheims, 1739, and licentiate of the College of Physicians, London, 1741. Andree practised in London and wrote several books, but is chiefly known for his connection with the London Hospital, first called the London Infirmary, which he was chiefly concerned in founding in 1740, and of which he was the first and for some time the only physician. He resigned this office and retired from practice in 1764, and died 4 February 1785.

Andree was an advocate of the practice of inoculation for the small-pox.

== Works ==
- Cases of the Epilepsy, Hysteric Fits, and St. Vitus's Dance, &c., 8vo, London, 1746 and 1753.
- Observations on a Treatise on the Virtues of Hemlock in the Cure of Cancers by Dr. Storck, 8vo, London, 1761.
- An Account of the Tilbury Water, 8vo, London, first edition, 1737; fifth edition, 1781.
- Inoculation impartially considered in a Letter to Sir E. Wilmot, Bart., 8vo, London, 1765.

== References and sources ==
Sources

- "Andree, John (1699?-1785)" . Dictionary of National Biography. London: Smith, Elder & Co. 1885–1900.
