= Anderson (surname) =

Origin
- Languages: English, Nordic
- Origin: Andrew
- Meaning: "Son of Ander/Andrew"

Other names
- Variant forms: D'Andrea, Andersen, Anderssen, Andersson, Andersonne, Andersons, Andersoun, Andirsoone, Andrásffy, Andrásfi, Andreadis, Andreasian, Andreasson, Andreasyan, Andreescu, Andreessen, Andreiescu, Andresen, Andresoun, Andresson, Andreou, Andrewson, Andrejević, Andrejavičius, Andrejevičius, Andrejić, Andrejsons, Andrzejowicz, Andreyev, Andriadze, Andriashvili, Andrić, Andriyuk, Andriyenko, Andriyiv, Andrijašević, Andrijavić, Andrijević, Androson, Ondřejovič, MacAnndrais, Wanderson

Anderson is a surname deriving from a patronymic meaning "son of Ander/Andrew" (itself derived from the Greek name "Andreas" (Ανδρεας), meaning "man," "brave," or "manly").

In Scotland, the name first appeared in records of the 14th century as "Fitz Andreu" (meaning son of Andrew), and developed in various forms by the Scottish Gaelic patronymic of "MacGhilleAndrais" which means "servant of St. Andrew". Variations of this name were MacAndrew, Gillanders and Anderson. The name soon migrated to other parts of Scotland due to the popularity of the name "Andrew" as associated with the Patron Saint of Scotland, and the largest grouping lies in the north-east of Scotland from the Mearns through Aberdeenshire, Banff, and Moray.

In England, the first recorded spelling of the family name is probably that of William Andreu, which was dated 1237, in the ancient charters of the county of Buckinghamshire, England, in the year 1237.

Anderson is the eighth most frequent surname in Scotland and 52nd most common in England.

In Sweden, the form Andersson is the most common surname along with Johansson.

In Norway and Denmark, the form Andersen is quite common, being the fifth most common surname in both countries. The name is also found to a lesser extent in northern Germany, e.g. the German vocalist Lale Andersen (1905–1972).

The Scandinavian forms Andersson and Andersen were often rendered as Anderson by immigrants to the English-speaking countries, whereby the latter form became one of the most common surnames in Anglophone North America. The name was the eleventh most common surname reported in the 1990 United States census, accounting for 0.3% of the population. It was the twelfth most common surname reported in the 2000 United States Census. Anderson is also one of the most popular surnames in Canada.

Other spelling variations include: Andison, Andersonne, Andersoun, Andirsoone, Andresoun, Androson, Andirston, Andresson, Andrewson, and Andresen.

== People ==
=== A ===
- Aaron Anderson (disambiguation), multiple people
- A. C. Anderson (1909–1996), Canadian pharmacist and politician
- A. Paul Anderson (born 1961), American politician
- A. Scott Anderson (1904–1971), American politician
- A. T. Anderson (1868–1949), British army officer
- Aaron Anderson (disambiguation), multiple people
- Abby Anderson (born 1997), American country music singer-songwriter
- Abdullah Anderson (born 1996), American football player
- Abraham Anderson (1829–1915), American businessman
- Abraham Archibald Anderson (1846–1940), American artist, rancher and philanthropist
- Adèle Anderson (born 1952), British actor
- Ada Anderson (1843–1913), 19th-century British athlete
- Adam Anderson (disambiguation), multiple people
- Adelaide Anderson (1863–1936), British civil servant and labor activist
- Adna Anderson (1827–1889), Engineer-in-Chief of the Northern Pacific Railroad
- Adrienne Anderson (born before 1965), American songwriter
- Agnes Steedman Anderson (1843–1914), Scottish hydrotherapist and activist
- Ago Anderson (born 1972), Estonian actor
- Al Anderson (disambiguation), multiple people
- Alan Anderson (disambiguation), multiple people
- Albert Anderson (disambiguation), multiple people
- Albin Garfield Anderson (1882–1971), American medical missionary
- Alby Anderson (1894–1980), Australian rules footballer
- Alden Anderson (1867–1944), American politician
- Aldon J. Anderson (1917–1996), American judge
- Alec Anderson (American football, born 1894) (1894–1953), American football player
- Alec Anderson (American football, born 1999) (born 1999), American football player
- Alejandro Anderson (born 1930), Argentine actor
- Alex Anderson (disambiguation), multiple people
- Alexander Anderson (disambiguation), multiple people
- Alexandria Anderson (born 1987), American sprinter
- Alf Anderson (1914–1985), American baseball player
- Alfa Anderson (1946–2024), American singer and educator
- Alfred Anderson (disambiguation), multiple people
- Alfredo Anderson (born 1978), Panamanian association football player
- Algodt C. Anderson (1860–1949), 20th century American politician
- Alice Anderson (disambiguation), multiple people
- Alida Anderson (born before 1984), American educator
- Alison Anderson (born 1958), Australian politician
- Allan Anderson (disambiguation), multiple people
- Allen L. Anderson (1837–1910), American Civil War officer
- Ally Anderson (born 1994), Australian rules footballer
- Alun Anderson (born 1948), British writer
- Alyse Anderson (born 1995), American mixed martial arts fighter
- Alyssa Anderson (born 1990), American swimmer
- Amanda Anderson (born 1960), American academic
- Amber Anderson (born 1992), British film actor, singer and model
- Ambrosia Anderson (born 1984), American women's basketball player
- Amos Anderson (1878–1961), Finnish-Swedish politician and publisher
- Amy Anderson (disambiguation), multiple people
- André Anderson (American football, born 1988), American football player
- André Anderson (footballer) (born 1999), Brazilian-Italian footballer
- Andre Anderson (boxer) (1890–1926), American boxer
- Andre Anderson (gridiron football, born 1955) (born 1955), American gridiron football player (born 1955)
- Andrea Anderson (born 1977), American sprinter
- Andree Anderson (born 1936), American ice dancer
- Andrew Anderson (disambiguation), multiple people
- Andy Anderson (disambiguation), multiple people
- Angela Anderson (living), German artist and filmmaker
- Angelina Anderson (born 2001), American professional soccer player
- Angry Anderson (1947–2026), Australian rock singer
- Ann Anderson (politician) (born 1952), American educator and politician
- Ann Stewart Anderson (1935–2019), American artist
- Anna Anderson (1896–1984), impostor who claimed to be Grand Duchess Anastasia Nikolaevna of Russia
- Anne Anderson (disambiguation), multiple people
- Anthony Anderson (disambiguation), multiple people
- Anton Anderson (1892–1960), American engineer and politician
- Antonio Anderson (born 1985), American basketball player
- Antonio Anderson (American football) (born 1973), American football player and coach
- Aric Anderson (born 1965), American football player
- Arit Anderson (living), British garden designer
- Arn Anderson (born 1958), American professional wrestler, road agent and author
- Arnold Anderson (disambiguation), multiple people
- Aron Anderson (born 1988), Swedish adventurer, motivational speaker and athlete
- Art Anderson (1936–2021), American football player
- Art Anderson (basketball) (1916–1983), American basketball player
- Arthur Anderson (disambiguation), multiple people
- Atholl Anderson (born 1943), New Zealand archaeologist and anthropologist
- Audrey J. Anderson (born 1965), American attorney
- Audrey Marie Anderson (born 1975), American actress and model
- Augusta Anderson (1875–1951), Swedish actress
- Ava Anderson, Viscountess Waverley (1895–1974), English political and social hostess
- Avery Anderson (born 1997), Kansas, United States state politician
- Avery Anderson III (born 2000), American basketball player
- Avril Anderson (born 1953), English composer
- Axel Anderson (1929–2012), German actor

=== B ===
- Babs Anderson (living), Botswanan lawn bowler
- Barbara Anderson (disambiguation), multiple people
- Barry Anderson (born 1954), American judge
- Barry Anderson (composer) (1935–1987), New Zealand-born composer, teacher and pioneer in electroacoustic music
- Beau Anderson (born 1982), Indigenous Australian darts player
- Beauford T. Anderson (1922–1996), United States Army Medal of Honor recipient
- Becky Anderson (born 1967), British journalist
- Belinda C. Anderson (born 1954), American academic administrator
- Ben Anderson (disambiguation), multiple people
- Benedict Anderson (1936–2015), American social scientist and professor
- Benjamin Anderson (disambiguation), multiple people
- Bennie Anderson (born 1977), American football offensive guard
- Bernard Anderson (trumpeter) (1919–1997), American musician
- Bernhard Anderson (1916–2007), American theologian
- Bernie Anderson (disambiguation), multiple people
- Bert Anderson (politician) (living), American politician and business owner
- Bertram Anderson (c.1505–71), English politician, MP for Newcastle upon Tyne
- Beth Andersen (born 1954), American singer and voice actress
- Beth Anderson (composer) (born 1950), American neo-romantic composer
- Betty Baxter Anderson (1908–1966), American author
- Betty Harvie Anderson, Baroness Skrimshire of Quarter (1913–1979), British Conservative Party politician
- Betty Lise Anderson (living), American electrical engineer, working in photonics
- Beverley Anderson (born 1938), American alpine skier
- Beverly Anderson (born 1943), American mathematician and academic
- Biddy Anderson (1874–1926), South African rugby union footballer and cricketer
- Bill Anderson (disambiguation), multiple people
- Billy Anderson (disambiguation), multiple people
- Björn Andersson, multiple people
- Black Jack Anderson (1900–1835), American pirate active in Australia
- Blair Anderson (born 1992), English footballer
- Blake Anderson (born 1984), American actor, comedian and producer
- Blake Anderson (American football) (born 1969), American football player and coach
- Bob Anderson (disambiguation), multiple people
- Bobby Anderson (disambiguation), multiple people
- Bobley Anderson (born 1992), Ivorian footballer
- Bonnie Anderson (Episcopalian) (living), President of the House of Deputies in the Episcopal Church in the United States of America
- Bonnie Anderson (singer) (born 1994), Australian musician
- Bonnie M. Anderson (born 1955), American journalist
- Brad Anderson (disambiguation), multiple people
- Bradford Anderson (born 1979), American actor
- Bradley Anderson, American politician
- Brady Anderson (born 1964), American baseball player
- Brady Anderson (footballer) (born 1975), Australian footballer
- Braeden Anderson (born 1992), Canadian basketball player and law student
- Brandon Anderson (American football) (born 1985), American football player
- Brandon Anderson (entrepreneur)
- Brent Anderson (disambiguation) multiple people
- Bret Anderson (born 1974), Canadian football player
- Brett Anderson (disambiguation), multiple people
- Brian Anderson (disambiguation), multiple people
- Britany Anderson (born 2001), Jamaican athletics competitor
- Brittny Anderson (living), Canadian politician
- Broncho Billy Anderson (1880–1971), American actor, writer, film director, and film producer
- Brooke Anderson (born 1978), American journalist, correspondent for "Entertainment Tonight"
- Brooke Anderson (actress) (born 1981), Australian actress
- Brooke D. Anderson (born 1964), American diplomat
- Bruce Anderson (disambiguation), multiple people
- Bryan Anderson (disambiguation), multiple people
- Bryant Anderson (born 1970), American professional wrestler
- Bryce Anderson (born 2004), American football player
- Bubbles Anderson (1904–1943), American baseball player
- Bud Anderson (1922–2024), American aviator and flying ace
- Bud Anderson (baseball) (born 1956), American baseball player
- Burton Anderson (living), American writer on wine, food, and travel

=== C ===
- C. Alfred "Chief" Anderson (1907–1996), American aviator
- C. Anthony Anderson (born 1940), American philosopher and Professor of Philosophy
- C. Arnold Anderson (1907–1990), American sociologist and economist
- C. Arthur Anderson (1899–1977), American politician
- C. Elmer Anderson (1912–1998), American politician
- C. J. Anderson (born 1991), American football player
- C. W. Anderson (born 1971), American professional wrestler
- Cadillac Anderson (born 1964), American professional basketball player
- Cal Anderson (1948–1995), American politician
- Caleb J. Anderson (1910–1996), Swedish politician
- Calvin Anderson (born 1996), American football player
- Cameron Anderson (politician) (1857–1926), Canadian politician
- Camille Anderson (born 1977), American actress and model
- Canute Anderson (1830–1893), member of the Wisconsin State Assembly
- Carl Anderson (disambiguation), multiple people
- Carleen Anderson (born 1957), American soul singer
- Carlos J. Anderson (1904–1978), American painter, illustrator and graphic designer
- Carlotta Adele Anderson (1876–1956), American teacher of the deaf
- Carlton Anderson (born 1992), American country music singer-songwriter
- Carmen Anderson (born 1955), Norfolk Islander lawn bowls player
- Carol Anderson (born 1959), American academic
- Caroline Anderson (writer) (living), British writer
- Caroline Still Anderson (1848–1919), American physician, educator, and activist
- Carrie Anderson (born 1950), American planetary scientist
- Casey Anderson (musician) (1934–1989), Afro-American blues and folk singer
- Casey Anderson (naturalist) (born 1975), American naturalist and TV presenter
- Casey O. Anderson (living), US State Senator
- Cat Anderson (1916–1981), American jazz trumpeter
- Catherine Anderson (born 1948), American novelist
- Catherine Anderson (scientist) (living), Canadian scientist
- Catherine Corley Anderson (1909–2001), American writer
- Cecilia Anderson (1855–1919), Swedish entomologist and collector
- Celeste Anderson (born 1989), Canadian competitive gamer, reality TV personality
- Chad Anderson (ice hockey) (born 1982), American ice hockey player
- Chad Anderson (politician) (born 1979), American politician
- Chandler P. Anderson (1866–1936), US diplomat
- Chantelle Anderson (born 1981), American basketball player
- Chapman L. Anderson (1845–1924), American politician
- Charity Anderson (born 2000), American dancer
- Charles Anderson (disambiguation), multiple people
- Charlie Anderson (born 1981), American football player
- Charlie Anderson (Australian footballer) (1903–1985), Australian footballer
- Charlotte Anderson (1915–2002), Australian scientist
- Charlotte Jones Anderson (born 1966), American football executive
- Chase Anderson (born 1987), American baseball player
- Chazz Anderson (born 1989), American-football player
- Cherine Anderson (born 1984), Jamaican singer
- Cheryl Anderson (living), American epidemiologist
- Chester Anderson (1932–1991), American writer and poet
- Chester Anderson (American football) (1918–2008), American football coach
- Chet Anderson (1945–2007), American football player
- Chic Anderson (1931–1979), American horse race announcer
- Chief William Anderson (1757–?), chief of the Algonquian-speaking Lenape (Delaware)
- Chris Anderson (disambiguation), multiple people
- Christian Anderson Jr. (born 2006), American basketball player
- Christina Anderson (playwright) (living), American playwright, educator
- Christine Anderson (born 1968), German politician
- Christopher Anderson (disambiguation), multiple people
- Christy Anderson (born 1969), American architectural historian
- Chuck Anderson (Canadian football) (1919–1975), player of American and Canadian football
- Chuck Anderson (jazz guitarist) (born 1947), American jazz guitarist
- Clayton Conrad Anderson (born 1959), American NASA astronaut
- Clóvis Anderson (born 1963), Brazilian cyclist
- Claire Anderson (disambiguation), multiple people
- Clarence W. Anderson (1871–1944), Canadian politician
- Clarence William Anderson (1891–1971), American author
- Clark L. Anderson (living), American academic
- Clary Anderson (1911–1988), American football and baseball coach
- Claude Anderson (1924–2010), Australian rules footballer
- Clayton Anderson (born 1959), American astronaut and engineer
- Cleave Anderson (living), Canadian rock, rockabilly, and punk drummer
- Cliff Anderson (1944–2021), American basketball player
- Cliff Anderson (American football) (1929–1979), American football player
- Clifford Anderson (1833–1899), American politician and Confederate Army officer
- Clifton Anderson (born 1957), American jazz musician
- Clinton Presba Anderson (1895–1975), American politician
- Clinton Anderson (Wisconsin politician) (born 1993), American politician
- Clinton Anderson (horse trainer) (living), Australian horse trainer
- Clive Anderson (born 1952), English television presenter
- Cody Anderson (born 1990), American football player
- Coffey Anderson (born 1978), American singer, songwriter, musician
- Col Anderson (born 1951), Australian rules footballer
- Colin Anderson (disambiguation), multiple people
- Collin Anderson (born 1999), Jamaican association football player
- Colt Anderson (born 1985), American football safety
- Connor Anderson (born 1996), Australian rugby union player
- Cora Reynolds Anderson (1882–1950), American politician
- Corey Anderson (cricketer), New Zealand cricketer
- Corey Anderson (fighter) (born 1989), American mixed martial arts fighter
- Corey Anderson (parathlete) (born 2000), Australia para athlete
- Cornealious Michael Anderson III (born c. 1977), American robber
- Craig Anderson (disambiguation), multiple people
- Curt Anderson (born 1949), Maryland legislator and broadcast journalist

=== D ===
- Daphne Anderson (1922–2013), British actor
- Dale Anderson (disambiguation), multiple people
- Dane Anderson, Australian cricket player
- Daniel J. Anderson (1945–2023), American ceramic artist
- Daniel R. Anderson (born 1944), American psychologist, known for being involved in the creation of children's television series
- Darius Anderson (born 1997), American football player
- David Anderson (disambiguation), multiple people
- Debra R. Anderson (1949–2022), American politician
- Del M. Anderson (born 1937) American academic administrator, former college president, model
- Dennis Anderson (disambiguation), multiple people
- Deonte Anderson (born 2002), American football player
- Derek Anderson (disambiguation), multiple people
- Des Anderson (born 1940), Northern Irish footballer
- Donald Anderson (disambiguation), multiple people
- Donna Anderson (born 1939), American actress
- Dougie Anderson (born 1976), Scottish presenter
- Dres Anderson (born 1992), American football player
- Drew Anderson (disambiguation), multiple people

=== E ===
- E. N. Anderson (born 1941), American professor of anthropology
- E. Riley Anderson (1932–2018), American judge
- Edmund E. Anderson, American auto designer
- Eduardo Belmont Anderson (born c. 1945), Peruvian billionaire businessman
- Edward Clifford Anderson (1815–1883), mayor of Savannah, Georgia, U.S.
- Edward Clifford Anderson Jr. (1839–1876), colonel during the American Civil War, nephew of the above
- Edward L. Anderson, United States Navy admiral
- Elizabeth S. Anderson, American philosopher
- Ella Anderson (born 2005), American actress, singer and model
- Ellen Anderson (born 1959), American politician
- Elton Anderson, American swamp pop singer
- Ernest Masson Anderson (1877–1960), Scottish geologist
- Ernestine Anderson (1928–2016), American jazz and blues singer
- Ernie Anderson, American voice actor and radio personality
- Ernie Anderson (footballer), (1896–unknown), Scottish footballer
- Eugene Anderson (1927–2010), American trial lawyer
- Evan Anderson (born 2002), American football player
- Evelyn Anderson (journalist) (1909–1977), German-British journalist and author
- Evelyn Anderson (dancer) (1907–1994), American dancer
- Evelyn M. Anderson (1899–1985), American physiologist and biochemist
- Ever Anderson (born 2007), American actress and model

=== F ===
- Felipe Anderson (born 1993), Brazilian midfield footballer
- Fleur Anderson, British politician
- Floyd E. Anderson (1891–1976), New York politician and judge
- Francis Anderson (disambiguation), multiple people
- Frank Anderson (baseball coach), American college baseball coach
- Fraser Anderson, dual-code rugby footballer
- Freya Anderson (born 2001), English freestyle swimmer

=== G ===
- Galusha Anderson, American theologian
- Garret Anderson (1972–2026), American baseball player
- Gary Anderson (disambiguation), multiple people
- Gene Anderson (wrestler) (1939–1991), American professional wrestler
- George Frederick Anderson, British musician and Master of the Queen's Music
- George Wayne Anderson (1839–1906), officer in the Confederate Army
- George Wayne Anderson (major) (1796–1872), American banker and major in the United States Army
- George Wayne Anderson (politician) (1863–1922), Virginia state legislator
- George Whelan Anderson Jr., U.S. Naval officer, admiral, Chief of Naval Operations
- Georgina Anderson (1998–2013), British singer
- Georgine Anderson (1928–2024), British actress
- Geraint Anderson, British analyst and columnist
- Gerald Anderson, Filipino celebrity
- Gerald Frank Anderson (1898–1983), British Empire military aviator and designer of chess problems
- Gerry Anderson, British television producer and puppeteer
- Gillian Anderson (born 1968), American actress
- Giovonnae Anderson, American electrical engineer
- Glenn Anderson, Canadian ice hockey player
- Gordon Anderson (disambiguation), several people

=== H ===
- Harry Anderson (1952–2018), American actor and magician
- Harry Anderson (artist) (1906–1996), American illustrator
- Heather Anderson (1994–2022), Australian rules footballer
- Heather Anderson (politician) (1959), Scottish politician
- Hedli Anderson (1907–1990), English singer and actor, second wife of the poet Louis MacNeice
- Henry Anderson (disambiguation), multiple people
- Herbert Anderson (1917–1994), American actor
- Herbert H. Anderson (1913–2001), American organic chemist
- Herbert L. Anderson (1914–1988), American nuclear physicist
- Ho Che Anderson (born 1969), American comic book artist
- Hugh Alan Anderson (1933–2015), Canadian politician
- Hugh C. Anderson (1851–1915), Lieutenant Governor of Tennessee

=== I ===
- Ian Anderson (disambiguation), multiple people
- Ijah Anderson (born 1975), English footballer
- Ivie Anderson (1904–1949), American jazz singer
- Isaac Anderson (disambiguation), multiple people

=== J ===
- Jace Anderson, American scriptwriter
- Jade Anderson, English singer-songwriter
- Jack Anderson (disambiguation), multiple people
- James Anderson (disambiguation), multiple people
- Jane Anderson (born 1954), American actress, screenwriter and director
- Janet Anderson Perkin (1921–2012), Canadian baseball player and curler
- Jared Anderson (boxer) (born 1999), American boxer
- Jason Anderson (American football), baseball player
- Jeff Anderson, American actor
- Jeffrey Anderson (radio producer) (1928–2014), Canadian music critic, journalist, and television and radio producer
- Jerald C. Anderson (1934–2014), American dentist and politician
- Jerime Anderson (born 1989), American basketball player
- Jesse Anderson, American murderer
- Jesse Anderson (musician) (1940–2014), American blues singer-songwriter and musician
- Jessica Anderson (disambiguation), multiple people
- Jodi Anderson (born 1957), American heptathlete
- Joey Anderson (born 1998), American ice hockey player
- John Anderson (disambiguation), multiple people
- Johnny Anderson (disambiguation), multiple people
- Jon Anderson (born 1944), English musician and singer, with Yes
- Jonas Anderson (born 1972), Thai-raised Swedish singer
- Jonathan Anderson (American football) (born 1991), American footballer
- Jonathan Anderson (fashion designer) (born 1984), Northern Irish fashion designer
- Josh Anderson (disambiguation), multiple people
- Joshua Anderson Hague (1850–1916), British landscape painter
- Joyce Anderson (1923–2014), American furniture designer and woodworker
- Joyce Anderson (artist) (1932–2022), Canadian painter and art teacher
- Judith Anderson (1897–1992), Australian film actor

=== K ===
- Kade Anderson (born 2004), American baseball player
- Karen Anderson (disambiguation), multiple people
- Karl Anderson (born 1980), American professional wrestler, born Chad Allegra
- Karl Anderson (hurdler) (1900–1989), American hurdler
- Karoy Anderson (born 2004), Jamaican-English footballer
- Kay Anderson (1902–1974), English artist
- Keith Anderson (born 1968), American country musician
- Keith Anderson (disambiguation), multiple people
- Ken or Kenneth Anderson (disambiguation), multiple people
- Kevin Anderson (disambiguation), multiple people
- Kip Anderson (1938–2007), American soul blues and R&B singer and songwriter
- Kyle Anderson (basketball) (born 1993), American basketball player

=== L ===
- Laurie Anderson (born 1947), American singer and performance artist
- Lennart Anderson (1928–2015), American painter
- Leroy Anderson (1908–1975), American composer
- Lily Anderson (1922–1982), Irish social campaigner and communist
- Linda Anderson (disambiguation), multiple people
- Lindsay Anderson (1923–1994), British film director
- Liz Anderson (1930–2011), American country music singer
- Loni Anderson (1945–2025), American actress
- Lorna Anderson, Scottish soprano
- Lory Anderson (born 1982), Paraguayan actor and presenter
- Louie Anderson (1953–2022), American comedian
- Louis Anderson, New Zealand rugby player
- Louis B. Anderson (1870–1946), American politician
- Lucy Anderson (disambiguation), multiple people
- Lynn Anderson (1947–2015), American country music singer

=== M ===
- Madge Easton Anderson (1896–1982), Scottish lawyer
- Mal Anderson (1935–2026), Australian tennis player
- Malcolm Playfair Anderson (1879–1919), American zoologist
- Marc Anderson, American percussionist
- Marcia Anderson, first African-American woman to attain major general in the US Army Reserve
- Marian Anderson (1897–1993), American opera singer; first African-American singer at the Metropolitan Opera
- Mario Anderson (born 2001), American football player
- Marisa Anderson, American guitarist
- Margaret Anderson (disambiguation), multiple people
- Marge Anderson (1932–2013), American politician
- Maria Frances Anderson (1819–1895), French-born American writer of prose and hymns
- Marian Anderson (1897–1993), American contralto
- Marie Anderson (1916–1996), American journalist
- Mark Anderson (disambiguation), multiple people
- Markus Anderson (born 2003), American soccer player
- Martin Anderson (disambiguation), multiple people
- Martina Anderson (born 1962), Northern Irish politician
- Marques Anderson (born 1979), founder of World Education Foundation and former NFL player
- Mary Anderson (actress, born 1918) (1918–2014), American actor
- Matt Anderson (volleyball) (born 1987), American volleyball player, Member of the United States men's team/ Olympic team
- M. T. Anderson (born 1968), American writer of children's books
- Maurice Anderson (American football) (born 1975), American football player
- Maxie Anderson (1934–1983), American balloonist
- Melissa Sue Anderson (born 1962), American actor
- Melody Anderson (born 1955), Canadian-American actor and social worker
- Merle K. Anderson (1904–1982), American politician and farmer
- Michael Anderson (disambiguation), multiple people
- Michelle Anderson (born 1967), American President of Brooklyn College, and a scholar on rape law
- Mignon Anderson (1892–1983), American actress
- Mignon Holland Anderson (born 1945), American writer
- Mike Anderson (disambiguation), multiple people
- Miller Anderson (disambiguation), multiple people
- Moses Anderson (1928–2013), American Roman Catholic bishop

=== N ===
- Nestell Kipp Anderson (1885–1967), American farmer who spearheaded the Appalachian Trail in Connecticut
- Nic Anderson (born 2004), American football player
- Nick Anderson (disambiguation), multiple people
- Nicole Gale Anderson (born 1990), American actor
- Nicole Anderson (psychologist) (born 1966), Canadian psychologist
- Nicole Anderson (philosopher), Australian philosopher
- Nicol Anderson (1882–1953), Anglican priest

=== O ===
- Oalex Anderson (born 1995), Vincentian footballer
- Orlando Anderson (1974–1998), American murder suspect
- Oskar Anderson (1887–1960), Russian-German statistician
- Ottis Anderson (born 1957), American football player

=== P ===
- Pamela Anderson (born 1967), Canadian-American model and actor
- Pamela Sue Anderson, English philosopher
- Paul Anderson (disambiguation), multiple people
- Penny Anderson, British ecologist
- Penny Anderson (rugby union) (born 1977), Australian rugby player
- Perry Anderson (born 1938), British historian and essayist
- Pete D. Anderson (1931–2013), American jockey and Thoroughbred racehorse trainer
- Peter Anderson (disambiguation), multiple people
- Philip W. Anderson (1923–2020), American theoretical physicist, the 1977 Nobel laureate in Physics
- Phyllis Margery Anderson (1901–1957), Australian pathologist
- Poul Anderson (1926–2001), American science fiction author

=== R ===
- Reuben V. Anderson (born 1943), American attorney
- Richard Anderson (disambiguation), multiple people
- Richard Lloyd Anderson (1926–2018), American lawyer and theologist
- Ricky Anderson (American football) (born 1963), American football player
- Robert Anderson (disambiguation), multiple people
- Rodney Anderson (Texas politician) (born 1968), American politician
- Rodney Anderson (American football) (born 1996), American football player
- Roger Anderson (1942–2018), American football player
- Roman Anderson (born 1969), English football player
- Rona Anderson (1926–2013), Scottish actor
- Ronald Anderson (1941–2020), American sociologist
- Rory Anderson (born 1992), American football player
- Ross Anderson (disambiguation), multiple people
- Rupert Anderson (1859–1944), English footballer
- Rudolf Anderson (1927–1962), U.S. Air Force pilot and first recipient of the Air Force Cross
- Russell Anderson (born 1978), Scottish footballer
- Ruthadell Anderson (1922–2018), American textile artist and sculptor
- Ryan Anderson (disambiguation), multiple people

=== S ===
- Sam Anderson (rugby league) (born 1991), Australian rugby league player
- Samuel Anderson (disambiguation), multiple people
- Sarah A. Anderson (1902–1992), American politician
- Sari Anderson (born 1978), American multisport and endurance athlete
- Sean Anderson (born 1988), aka Big Sean, American rapper
- Shaun Anderson (born 1994), American baseball player
- Sherwood Anderson (1876–1941), American writer
- Signe Toly Anderson (1941–2016), American singer
- Siwan Anderson, Canadian economist and professor
- Sonia Anderson (1944–2020), British archivist
- Sonny Anderson (born 1970), Brazilian footballer
- Sophie Anderson (disambiguation), multiple people
- Sparky Anderson (1934–2010), American baseball manager
- Spencer Anderson (born 2000), American football player
- Stan Anderson (1933–2018), English footballer
- Stephen R. Anderson (born 1943), American linguist
- Stephen Wayne Anderson (1953–2002), American executed murderer of Elizabeth Lyman
- Steve Anderson, several people
- Steven Anderson (pastor) (born 1981), American preacher
- Sundiata Anderson (born 2000), American football player
- Sunshine Anderson (born 1974), American R&B and soul singer and songwriter
- Sylvia Anderson (1927–2016), English television and film producer, co-creator of TV series with Gerry Anderson

=== T ===
- Teyona Anderson, fashion model
- Terrell Anderson (born 2005), American football player
- Terry Anderson (disambiguation), multiple people
- Theodore Wilbur Anderson (1918–2016), American statistician, co-inventor of the Anderson–Darling test
- Thomas Anderson (disambiguation), multiple people
- Tim Anderson (disambiguation), multiple people
- Tom Anderson (born 1970), American co-founder of the social networking website Myspace
- Tyler Anderson (born 1989), American baseball player

=== V ===
- Vernon Andy Anderson (1896–1999), American missionary
- Vicki Anderson (1939–2023), American soul singer
- Victor Anderson (disambiguation), multiple people
- Viv Anderson (born 1954), English footballer
- Vivian Anderson (baseball) (1921–2012), All-American Girls Professional Baseball League player

=== W ===
- Warren Anderson (disambiguation), multiple people
- Wayne Anderson (disambiguation), multiple people
- Wendell Anderson (1933–2016), Minnesota politician
- Wes Anderson, American film director
- William Anderson (disambiguation), multiple people

=== Family ===
- Anderson family, a group of American professional wrestlers who are billed as relatives:
  - Gene Anderson (wrestler) (1933–1991), fictional brother
  - Lawrence Heinemi Lars Anderson (born 1939, real name Lawrence Heinemi), fictional brother
  - Ole Anderson (born 1942, real name Alan Rogowski), fictional brother
  - Arn Anderson (born 1958, real name Martin Lunde), fictional cousin
  - Brad Anderson (wrestler) (born 1969), real-life son of Gene
  - Bryant Anderson, born 1970 as Brian Rogowski, real-life son of Ole
  - C. W. Anderson (born 1971; real name Chris Wright), relationship undetermined but billed as a part of the "family"
  - Karl Anderson (born 1980; real name Chad Allegra), relationship undetermined but billed as a part of the "family"
  - Brock Anderson (born 1997; real name Brock Lunde), real-life son of Arn

=== Fictional characters ===
- Abigail "Abby" Anderson, of The Last of Us Part II
- Alexander Anderson (Hellsing), in the Japanese anime/manga series
- Blaine Anderson, from Glee
- Jesse Anderson, from Yu-Gi-Oh! GX
- Jessie Anderson, from The Walking Dead
- Trent Anderson, character from Dan Brown's novel The Lost Symbol
- Judge Anderson, from Judge Dredd
- Tom Anderson (Beavis and Butt-head), neighbor from Beavis and Butthead

== See also ==
- Andersen
- Anderson (given name)
- Clan Anderson
- Earl of Yarborough, Peerage created in the United Kingdom (Anderson-Pelham family)
- Lord Anderson (disambiguation), multiple people
- Anderson Baronets, nine British baronetcies, all extinct
- Assassination of Danilo Anderson (1966–2004), Venezuelan prosecutor murdered in 2004

=== Individuals née Anderson ===
- Addie Anderson Wilson née Anderson (1876–1966), American composer, organist and carillonist
- Amy Olson née Anderson (born 1992), professional golfer
- Beverley Manley née Anderson (born 1941), Jamaican political scientist
- Cheri Keaggy née Anderson (born 1968), American gospel singer and songwriter
- Constance Sladen née Anderson (1848–1906), English architectural historian and philanthropist
- Cora Roberton née Anderson (1881–1962), New Zealand nurse (1881–1962)

=== Other individuals ===
- Adam West born William West Anderson (1928–2017), American actor
- Agnes Campbell (printer), married name Anderson, (1637–1716), Scottish printer and book merchant
- Aisling Loftus, married name Anderson, (born 1990), English actress
- Anderson .Paak born Brandon Paak Anderson (born 1986), American rapper, singer, songwriter, record producer, and drummer
- Andrea Anderson-Mason (living), Canadian politician
- Big Sean aka Sean Michael Leonard Anderson (born 1988), American rapper from Michigan
- Bob Andy aka Keith Anderson (1944–2020), Jamaican vocalist and songwriter
- Cheerleader Melissa aka Melissa Anderson (born 1982), American professional wrestler
- James Anderson-Besant (born 1998), British organist and choir director
