= Jessie Anderson =

Jessie Anderson may refer to:

- Jessie Anderson (field hockey), New Zealand field hockey player
- Jessie Anderson (The Walking Dead)

== See also ==
- Jessie Valentine, née Anderson, Scottish amateur golfer
- Jesse Anderson (disambiguation)
- Jessica Anderson (disambiguation)
