= Colin Anderson =

Colin Anderson may refer to:

- Colin Anderson (footballer) (born 1962), English footballer
- Colin Anderson (sport shooter) (1912–1987), Australian sports shooter
- Colin Anderson (American football) (born 1989), American football tight end
- Colin Anderson (rugby league), English rugby league footballer of the 1950s
- Col Anderson (born 1951), Australian rules footballer
- Colin Anderson (shot putter) (born 1951), winner of the 1979 USA Indoor Track and Field Championships
- Sir Colin Anderson (shipowner), British art collector and benefactor, chairman of the committee which produced the 1960 Anderson Report
