= Lord Anderson =

Lord Anderson may refer to:

- Adam Anderson, Lord Anderson (1797–1853), Scottish judge, Solicitor General for Scotland and Fellow of the Royal Society of Edinburgh
- Andrew Anderson, Lord Anderson (1862–1936), Scottish barrister, judge and Liberal Party politician
- David Anderson, Baron Anderson of Ipswich (born 1961), British barrister
- Donald Anderson, Baron Anderson of Swansea (born 1939), Welsh Labour Party politician

== See also ==
- Ruth Smeeth, Baroness Anderson of Stoke-on-Trent (born 1979), British Labour Party politician
- Earl of Yarborough, peerage created in the United Kingdom (Anderson-Pelham family)
- Anderson baronets, nine baronetcies in the United Kingdom (all extinct)
- Anderson (surname)
