= Arthur Anderson =

Arthur Anderson may refer to:

== Politicians ==
- Arthur Anderson (politician) (1860–1915), Australian politician
- C. Arthur Anderson (1899–1977), U.S. representative from Missouri

== Sportsmen ==
- Arthur Anderson (sprinter) (1886–1967), British track-and-field athlete who competed in the 1912 Olympics
- Art Anderson (basketball) (1916–1983), American professional basketball player
- Art Anderson (1936–2021), college and professional American football player

== Other people ==
- Arthur Anderson (businessman) (1792–1868), Scottish businessman and co-founder of the Peninsular and Oriental Steam Navigation Company (P&O)
- Arthur Anderson (dramatist) (1873–1942), English dramatist and lyricist
- Arthur J. O. Anderson (1907–1996), anthropologist and Nahuatl translator
- Arthur Anderson (actor) (1922–2016), American actor
- Arthur Anderson (architect) (1868–1942), Australian architect

== Other uses ==
- SS Arthur M. Anderson, ship on the Great Lakes

== See also ==
- Arthur Andersen, accounting firm
- Arthur E. Andersen (1885–1947), founder of Chicago-based accounting firm
- Arthur Andersen LLP v. United States, U.S. Supreme Court case
