= Bernard Anderson =

Bernard or Bernie Anderson imay refer to:

- Bernard Anderson (trumpeter) (1919–1997), American jazz trumpeter
- Bernard E. Anderson, American economist
- Bernie Anderson (American football), American football coach
- Bernie Anderson (footballer) (1941–2012), Australian rules footballer
- Bernie Anderson (teacher-legislator) (1942–2014), Nevada teacher turned Assemblyman
- Bernie Anderson Jr., silent film music composer, organist and orchestrator
