= Mr. Anderson =

Mr. Anderson may refer to:

- Ken Anderson (wrestler), American professional wrestler, formerly known as "Mr. Anderson"
- Neo (The Matrix), main character in the film, referred to as "Mr. Anderson"
- Mr. Anderson (Beavis and Butt-head), a supporting character in Beavis and Butt-Head

== See also ==
- Anderson (surname)
