= Pritzker School of Medicine =

Medical school at the University of Chicago

Coordinates: 41°47′31.0″N 87°36′10.1″W

University of Chicago Pritzker School of Medicine
- Former name: University of Chicago School of Medicine (1927–1968)
- Type: Private
- Established: 1927
- Parent institution: University of Chicago
- Dean: Mark Anderson, MD, PhD
- Students: 358 (2019–2020)
- Location: Chicago, Illinois, United States
- Campus: Urban
- Website: pritzker.bsd.uchicago.edu

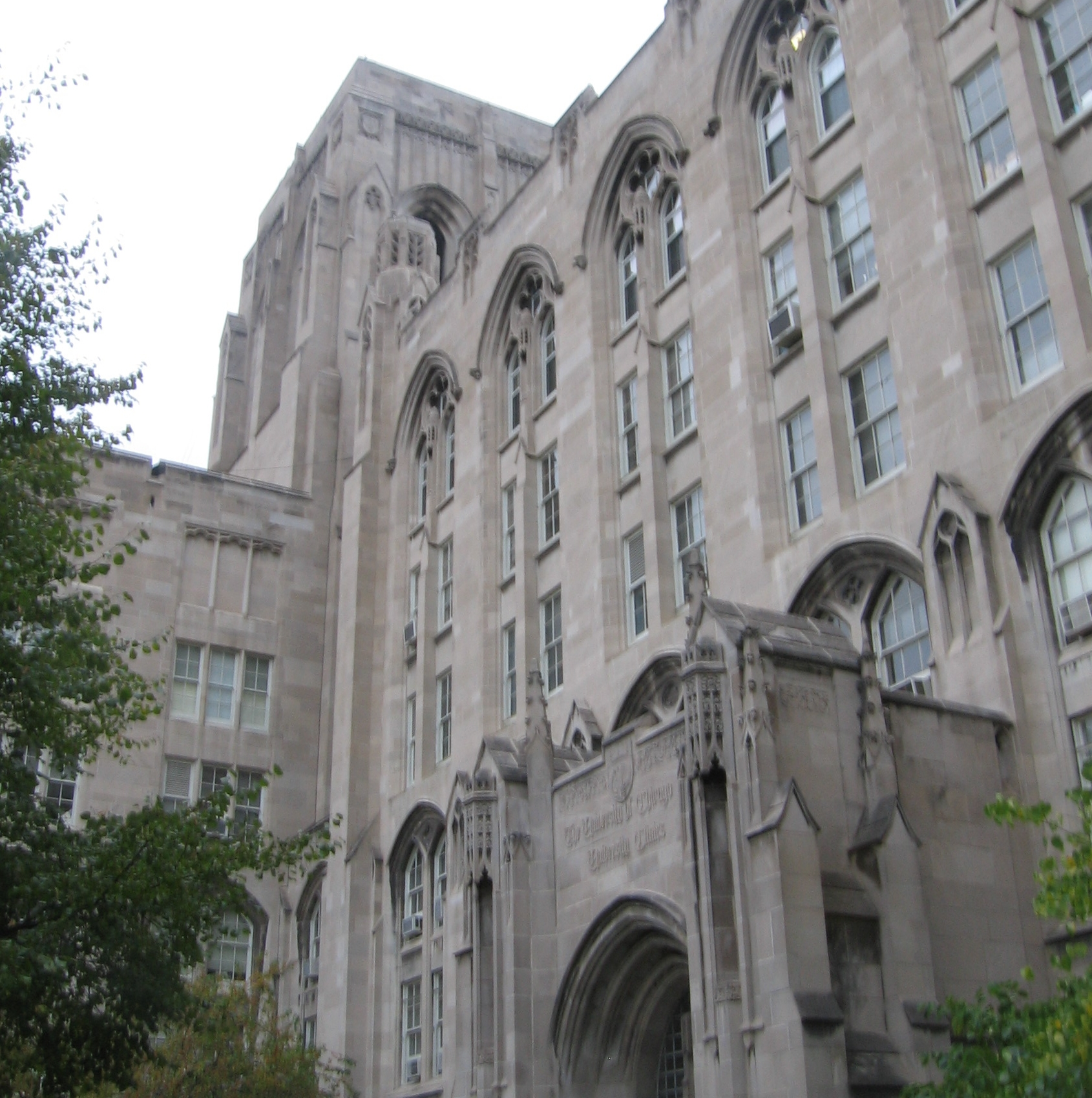
One of the many buildings that house offices of the Pritzker school. Although constructed after the main quadrangles, the Pritzker buildings adhere to Gothic architectural norms

The University of Chicago Pritzker School of Medicine is the Doctor of Medicine degree-granting unit within the Biological Sciences Division of the University of Chicago. It is located on the university's main campus in the Hyde Park neighborhood of Chicago and matriculated its first class in 1927. It offers a full-time Doctor of Medicine degree program, joint degree programs, graduate medical education, and continuing medical education. Its primary teaching hospital is the University of Chicago Medical Center.

== History ==
Interest in opening a medical school at the University of Chicago began in 1898 when the university maintained association with Rush Medical College while the university endeavored to establish funds for the construction of a medical school. The association with Rush Medical College continued until 1942. In 1916, the university's board of trustees set aside $5.3 million for its development, but World War I delayed its construction until 1921. With construction complete in 1927, the school matriculated its first class of medical students. Following a US$16 million gift from the Pritzker family of Chicago (founders of the Hyatt hotel group) to the University of Chicago, the University of Chicago School of Medicine was renamed in their honor in 1968.

Pritzker was the first medical school to hold the now international tradition of the white coat ceremony in 1989, which celebrates the students' transition and commitment to a lifelong career as a physician.

Since its inception, the University of Chicago Pritzker School of Medicine and its affiliated faculty have been associated with numerous landmark discoveries in biomedical science, including 13 Nobel Prize laureates in Physiology or Medicine. In the 1960s, researchers at the University of Chicago were among the first to characterize proinsulin, the precursor molecule to insulin, providing key insights into hormone biosynthesis and diabetes. In the 1970s, Eugene Goldwasser, a biochemist at the university, identified erythropoietin, the hormone responsible for regulating red blood cell production. After sharing the small quantities he had isolated with researchers at Amgen, the hormone was later mass-produced using recombinant DNA technology and became a widely used treatment for anemia. The institution has also made foundational contributions to cancer biology and treatment, including the demonstration by Charles Huggins that prostate cancer is hormonally driven, work that earned the Nobel Prize, and the identification by Janet Rowley of chromosomal translocations in leukemia, establishing the genetic basis of cancer and paving the way for targeted therapies. In addition, modern sleep science traces important roots to the university through the work of Nathaniel Kleitman, who, along with his student Eugene Aserinsky, first identified rapid eye movement (REM) sleep in 1953 using electroencephalography. Peter Huttenlocher, who joined the faculty in 1974, was the first to systematically describe how synaptic connections in the developing brain are overproduced in early childhood and then selectively “pruned,” fundamentally shaping modern understanding of neuroplasticity.

== Admissions ==
For the entering Class of 2023, 6,564 people applied and 629 interviewed for a class size of 90 spots; accepted applicants had a GPA range of 3.30 and 4.00, and a MCAT score range of 505-527.

== Rankings ==
U.S. News & World Report, in its 2022 edition of rankings, ranked Pritzker School of Medicine #17 in "Best Medical Schools: Research".

== Education ==
The Pritzker School of Medicine offers the Doctor of Medicine (M.D.) degree. The school offers joint doctorate degrees through its Medical Scientist Training Program, Growth, Development, and Disabilities Training Program and MD-PhD Programs in Medicine, the Social Sciences, and Humanities. Joint master's degrees are offered in business, law, and policy.

A peer-reviewed publication in the journal for the Association of American Medical Colleges (AAMC) found that Pritzker ranked 4th among top U.S. medical schools for graduate success in academic medicine and biomedical research (i.e., awards, publications, grants, and clinical trials from 60 years of graduate outcomes analysis up to 2015).

The school's primary teaching hospital is the University of Chicago Medical Center. In July 2008, Pritzker entered into a teaching affiliation with NorthShore University HealthSystem.

== Notable alumni ==
- Clark L. Anderson, class of 1964, immunologist and Professor Emeritus, Ohio State University College of Medicine
- Bruce Beutler, class of 1981, American immunologist and geneticist. Together with Jules A. Hoffmann, he received one-half of the 2011 Nobel Prize in Physiology or Medicine, for "their discoveries concerning the activation of innate immunity".
- Ernest Beutler, class of 1950, German-born American hematologist and biomedical scientist. He made important discoveries about the causes of a number of diseases, including anemias, Gaucher disease, disorders of iron metabolism and Tay–Sachs disease.
- Richard Kekuni Blaisdell, class of 1948, professor emeritus of medicine at the University of Hawaiʻi in Honolulu, and a longtime organizer in the Hawaiian Sovereignty Movement.
- David Bodian, class of 1937, American medical scientist whose work helped lay the groundwork for the eventual development of polio vaccines by combining neurological research with the study of the pathogenesis of polio.
- Robert M. Chanock, class of 1947, American pediatrician and virologist who made major contributions to the prevention and treatment of childhood respiratory infections.
- Robert Gallo, GME 1965, known for his role in the discovery of the human immunodeficiency virus (HIV) as the infectious agent responsible for acquired immune deficiency syndrome (AIDS) and in the development of the HIV blood test.
- Todd Golub, class of 1989, Professor of Pediatrics at the Harvard Medical School, the Charles A. Dana Investigator in Human Cancer Genetics at the Dana-Farber Cancer Institute, and a founding member of the Broad Institute of MIT and Harvard.
- Anthony Letai, Ph.D class of 1993, M.D. class of 1995, oncologist, cancer researcher and director of the National Cancer Institute.
- Clarence Lushbaugh, Ph.D. class of 1942, M.D. class of 1948, pathologist and radiobiological specialist
- Sara Branham Matthews, PhD class of 1923, MD class of 1934, was an American microbiologist and physician best known for her research into the isolation and treatment of Neisseria meningitidis, a causative organism of meningitis.
- Dianne B. McKay, M.D. 1983, immunologist
- Anne L. Peters, class of 1983, endocrinologist, diabetes expert, and professor of clinical medicine at the Keck School of Medicine of USC
- Joseph Ransohoff, class of 1941, pioneer in the field of neurosurgery; founder of the first neurosurgical intensive care unit; chief of neurosurgery at N.Y.U. Medical Center
- Gerald Reaven, class of 1953, noted researcher of diabetes and insulin resistance.
- Janet Rowley, class of 1948, American human geneticist and the first scientist to identify a chromosomal translocation as the cause of leukemia and other cancers.
- Arthur K. Shapiro, class of 1955, psychiatrist and expert on Tourette syndrome.
- Donald F. Steiner, class of 1956, an American biochemist and discoverer of proinsulin.

== Further reading. ==
- Palmer, Walter L. "Franklin Chambers McLean and the Founding of the University of Chicago School of Medicine." Perspectives in biology and medicine 22.2 (1979): S2-S32. 10.1353/pbm.1979.0045
