= Ben Anderson =

Benjamin or Ben Anderson may refer to:

== Arts and entertainment ==
- Benny Andersen (1929–2018), Danish poet
- Benny Andersson (born 1946), Swedish musician and composer
- Ben Anderson (actor), Australian actor
- Ben Anderson (journalist) (born 1974), television personality and reporter for the BBC
- Benjamin Anderson (musician) (born 1974), American musician and songwriter

== Sports ==
- Ben Anderson (footballer) (born 1946), Scottish footballer
- Benny F. Andersen (born 1963), Danish sailor
- Bennie Anderson (born 1977), American football offensive guard
- Ben Anderson (rugby league) (born 1978), Australian rugby league footballer

== Other uses ==
- Benjamin Anderson (adventurer) (1834–1910), Liberian traveller, politician, and educator
- Benjamin Anderson (soldier) (1836–1865), Confederate soldier
- Benjamin Anderson (1886–1949), American economist
- Benedict Anderson (1936–2015), professor emeritus of International Studies at Cornell University
- Ben Anderson (entrepreneur) (born 1981), American entrepreneur

== See also ==
- Ben Anderson Barrage, part of Queensland's irrigation system
