= Josh Anderson =

Josh Anderson may refer to:

- Josh Anderson (Neighbours), character who appeared on the soap opera Neighbours
- Josh Anderson (baseball) (born 1982), Major League Baseball outfielder
- Josh Anderson (ice hockey) (born 1994), National Hockey League forward
- Josh Anderson (serial killer) (born 1987), American serial killer
- Josh Anderson (American football), college football coach
