= Adam Anderson =

Adam Anderson may refer to:

- Adam Anderson (American football) (born 1999), American football player
- Adam Anderson (economist) (c. 1693–1765), Scottish economist
- Adam Anderson (monster truck driver) (born 1985), American monster truck driver
- Adam Anderson (composer) (born 1984), member of the British synthpop duo Hurts
- Adam Anderson (physicist) (1783–1846), Scottish writer on physics and encyclopedist
- Adam Anderson (politician), member of the Florida House of Representatives
- Adam Anderson (tennis) (born 1969), Australian tennis player
- Adam Anderson, Lord Anderson (c. 1797–1853), Scottish judge
