= Carlotta Adele Anderson =

American educator

Carlotta Adele Anderson (Mrs. J. Scott Anderson) (March 18, 1876 – March 6, 1956) was an American educator, especially interested in the Montessori method and in the instruction of the deaf and mute.

She was born in New York City, the daughter of Newell Willard Bloss and Emma C. Jones, and studied at various colleges and universities, among them the Wright Humason School for oral teaching of the deaf, and Teachers College, Columbia University. She studied the Montessori method in Rome. Herself a teacher of the deaf for several years, she was from 1903 to 1915 the owner of oral schools for the deaf and of teacher-training schools in New York and Pennsylvania. For many years, she interested herself in introducing the Montessori method in public schools. She was in charge of training teachers of the deaf at the New Jersey State Normal School at Trenton (1918–1921). She was United States delegate to the third International Congress on Home Education at Brussels in 1910 and was general secretary of the fourth International Congress.
