= AutoMotion =

Mobile application management

- Available in: English
- Headquarters: Minneapolis, Minnesota, {{{location_country}}}
- Area served: North America
- Founder: Ben Anderson
- Key people: Ben Anderson (CEO)
- Website: automotionapp.com

AutoMotion is a data and mobile application management (MAM) platform for large-scale retail brands. Headquartered in Minneapolis, MN, United States, the company is an integrated partner to large technology and AI platforms.

== History ==
AutoMotion's launch was featured in Automotive News as one of their "10 cool technologies". The company's partnerships included Apple, General Motors, Microsoft, Google, and Group 1. The company unveiled a consumer brand in 2018 and surpassed 3,500 partners in 2019.

The founder, Ben Anderson, was awarded several state, regional, and global awards for student entrepreneurship including Young Entrepreneur of the Year by the Small Business Administration.

== Products and services ==
The AutoMotion platform manages data and integrations for large-scale retail and services partners world-wide.

== See also ==
- Mobile Application Management (MAM)
- Mobile application development
