= Anne L. Peters =

American doctor

- Born: New York City, New York, U.S.
- Education: Wesleyan University; Pritzker School of Medicine at the University of Chicago
- Occupation: Diabetologist
- Spouse: Eric Roth
- Children: 1

Anne Peters is a endocrinologist, diabetes expert, and professor of clinical medicine at the Keck School of Medicine of USC. She runs diabetes centers in well-served Beverly Hills and under-resourced East Los Angeles. She teaches physicians and people with diabetes around the world how to better treat the condition, through lifestyle, medications and technology.

== Early life and education ==
Peters was born in New York City, New York, but spent much of her youth in Madison, Wisconsin. She attended Wesleyan University (B.A. in biology, 1979), and earned an M.D. from the Pritzker School of Medicine in 1983. She did her residency in Internal Medical at Stanford University Medical Center and Harbor–UCLA Medical Center and her fellowship in endocrinology at Cedars-Sinai Medical Center. During her senior year of medical school she worked at Elim Hospital in Gazankulu, South Africa.

== Career ==
Peters ran diabetes programs at Cedars, then at UCLA and finally moved to USC so she could spend more time working with the underserved. Currently she holds the rank of Professor of Clinical Medicine, Clinical Scholar, the highest clinical rank in the Keck School of Medicine of USC. She has written many articles, four books and has received many research grants. For the past 20 years she has worked with the Department of Health Services for Los Angeles County developing a county-wide system for diabetes care.

Peters has been part of multiple guideline writing groups and has written national and international guidelines. These include guidelines for transitioning care, the management of type 1 and type 2 diabetes and use of diabetes devices. She was a member of the ADA Professional Practice Committee writing the 2020, 2021 and 2022 ADA Standards of Care. She, along with several colleagues, was the first to publish a large case series about the risk of a severe condition known as diabetic ketoacidosis in people taking a type of medication known as an SGLT-2 inhibitor.

Her work in East LA was featured in the PBS series Remaking American Medicine. She received the American Diabetes Association "Outstanding Physician Clinician" Award in 2008, the Bernardo Alberto Houssay Award from the National Minority Quality Forum in 2010 and the Endocrine Society Laureate Award for Outstanding Public Service in 2021. Multiple patients have noted her involvement in their lives—Don Rickles wrote of her in his book Rickles' Letters and William Friedkin did so in The Friedkin Connection. Larry King featured her on a segment of Larry King Live. She worked with Olympian Gary Hall Jr and Indy car driver Charlie Kimball.

She is a Fellow of the American College of Physicians.

== #MeToo ==
In 1999, she was allegedly assaulted by a patient in an exam room at UCLA. She wrote an essay about the experience keeping the name of the patient anonymous. His identity was revealed by a Vanity Fair reporter, identifying him as Les Moonves. Moonves then admitted to trying to force his doctor to "kiss him". Peters' confidential testimony to the CBS lawyers, which was subsequently leaked to the press, helped strip Moonves of his severance package.
