= Andreadis =

Andreadis (Greek: Ανδρεάδης) is a Greek surname. The female version -in Greek- of the name is Andreadi or Andreadou. But, following the Latin or English language, it is recommended as for the female version of the name, to use the same root which is also "Andreadis".

Andreadis is a patronymic surname which literally means "the son of Andreas", equivalent to English Anderson.

Notable examples include:

== Men ==
- George Andreadis (1936–2015), Greek novelist
- Teddy Andreadis, American musician

== Women ==
- Ianna Andreadis (born 1960), Greek artist and photographer
