= Noel Anderson (footballer) =

Australian rules footballer (born 1938)

Personal information
- Full name: Noel Anderson
- Born: 16 September 1938
- Original team: Bunyip
- Height: 183 cm (6 ft 0 in)
- Weight: 86 kg (190 lb)

Playing career^{1}
Years	Club	Games (Goals)
1959	North Melbourne	1 (0)
1959–60	Richmond	12 (0)
Total		13 (0)
- ^{1} Playing statistics correct to the end of 1960.

Noel Anderson (born 16 September 1938) is a former Australian rules footballer who played with North Melbourne and Richmond in the Victorian Football League (VFL).

== Family ==
He is the brother of Richmond footballer Bernie Anderson.
