= Samuel Anderson =

Samuel or Sam Anderson may refer to:

== Arts and entertainment ==
- Sam Anderson (born 1947), American television actor
- Sam Sneed (Sam Anderson, born 1968), American record producer and rapper
- Sam Anderson (Tamil actor) (born 1977), Indian actor in Tamil-language films
- Samuel Anderson (actor) (born 1982), English stage and television actor
- Sam Anderson (The Walking Dead), character in television series The Walking Dead

== Military and politics ==
- Samuel Anderson (Pennsylvania politician) (1773–1850), U.S. representative from Pennsylvania, U.S. navy surgeon and officer with the Pennsylvania militia
- Samuel Anderson (Florida politician) (1841–1908), American politician in Florida
- Samuel Read Anderson (1804–1883), Confederate general in the American Civil War
- Samuel Anderson (surveyor) (1839–1881), British army surveyor
- Samuel E. Anderson (1906–1982), United States Air Force general
- Samuel J. Anderson (1824–1905), American railroad executive and member of the Maine House of Representatives
- Samuel W. Anderson, American businessman and assistant secretary of commerce for international affairs

== Sports ==
- Sam Anderson (footballer) (fl. 1910s–1920s), Scottish footballer
- Samuel Anderson (athlete) (1929–2012), Cuban hurdler
- Sam Anderson (rugby league) (born 1991), Australian rugby league footballer

== Others ==
- Samuel Anderson (Australian settler) (1803–1863), Australian agriculturist and explorer
- Sam Anderson (writer), American journalist, critic at large for The New York Times Magazine
- Samuel Lee Anderson, Irish lawyer and secret service officer

== See also ==
- Samuel Anderson Architects, New York City based architecture firm
