= Colin Anderson (rugby league) =

English rugby league footballer

Personal information
- Born: unknown

Playing information
Club
Years	Team	Pld	T	G	FG	P
1950–56	Castleford	121	20	5	0	70
1956–58	Featherstone Rovers	15	1	0	0	3
	Total	136	21	5	0	73

Colin Anderson (birth unknown) is a former professional rugby league footballer who played in the 1950s. He played at club level for Castleford, and Featherstone Rovers.

== Playing career ==
=== Club career ===
Colin Anderson made his début for Featherstone Rovers on Saturday 7 April 1956, and he played his last match for Featherstone Rovers during the 1957–58 season.
