= Johnny Anderson =

Johnny Anderson may refer to:

- Johnny Anderson (politician), former member of the Utah House of Representatives
- Johnny Anderson (footballer) (1929–2001), Scottish football goalkeeper
- Johnny Anderson (racing driver) (born 1942), American racing driver

== See also ==
- John Anderson
