= Claire Anderson =

Claire Anderson may refer to:

- Claire Anderson (actress) (1891–1964), American actress
- Claire Anderson (bowls) (born 1992), Scottish lawn bowler
- Claire Anderson (DJ), English radio DJ, television presenter and voice-over artist
- Claire Anderson (scientist), British pharmacist
