= Cecilia Anderson =

Pioneering entomologist (1855–1919)

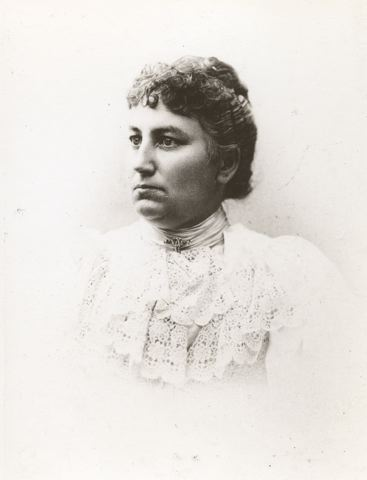
Cecilia Anderson

Cecilia Anderson born Cecilia Andersdotter (19 June 1855 – 20 November 1919) was a Swedish amateur entomologist who collected insects from around the world. She started her career in America as a maidservant and became the wife of a Swedish engineer who became a US consul in Denmark.

== Life and work ==
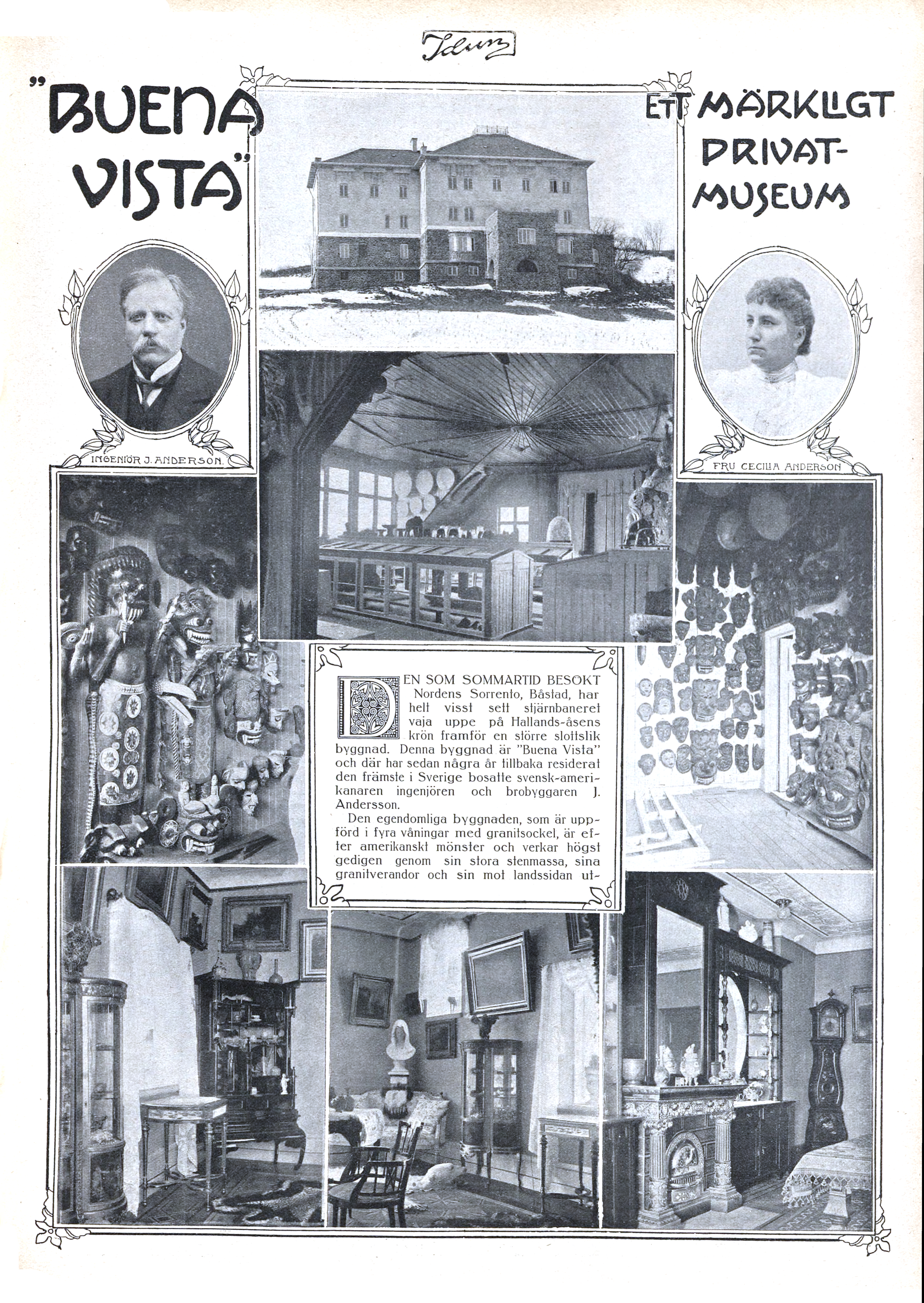
A 1913 report on the private museum at Buena Vista

Cecilia Andersdotter was born in Brunnby, Skåne, to Sissa Olsdotter and Anders Larsson. She grew up on her father's Fjällatorp estate and went to Brunnby school from 1864. She moved to America at the age of seventeen, leaving Sweden in April 1873, registering as a maidservant. In 1880, she met and married John Frans Anderson from Jämshög, Blekinge, who was involved in bridge construction in the US. She travelled along with her husband to Australia and Cuba on work and later they travelled widely. On these travels she collected insects as well as other natural history and ethnographic objects. Around 1897-98, the couple moved back to settle in Djursholm, Stockholm. Here they built a large home known as the Cuba-Anderson's Villa. In 1906 they moved to Båstad where they built a fifty-two room villa called Buena Vista which housed their private museum. Her large collections of insects were housed here and she also sent specimens to the National Natural History Museum, communicating with Christopher Aurivillius and later the (first Swedish woman entomology curator) Signe Ramberg (1875-1963). In 1906 she was also elected to the Entomological Society in Stockholm. In 1915, her husband was appointed consul for USA in Copenhagen and they lived in Denmark. She then sold off many of her collections which were dispersed to various museums including those in Stockholm, Lund, Malmö and Helsingborg. Her insect collection went to Lund but her mollusc collection is untraced. In 1916, they moved to San Diego where she associated with the San Diego Natural History Museum. She died in 1919 and was buried in Greenwood Memorial Park.
