= Bernie Anderson (footballer) =

Australian rules footballer (1941–2012)

Personal information
- Full name: Bernard Edward Anderson
- Born: 29 January 1941
- Died: 22 August 2012 (aged 71); South Korea
- Original team: Bunyip
- Height: 188 cm (6 ft 2 in)
- Weight: 96 kg (212 lb)

Playing career^{1}
Years	Club	Games (Goals)
1959–1960	Richmond	3 (2)
- ^{1} Playing statistics correct to the end of 1960.

Bernard Edward Anderson (29 January 1941 – 22 August 2012) was an Australian rules footballer who played for the Richmond Football Club in the Victorian Football League (VFL).

== Family ==
He is the brother of Richmond footballer Noel Anderson.
