= Carrie Anderson =

American planetary scientist

Carrie M. Anderson
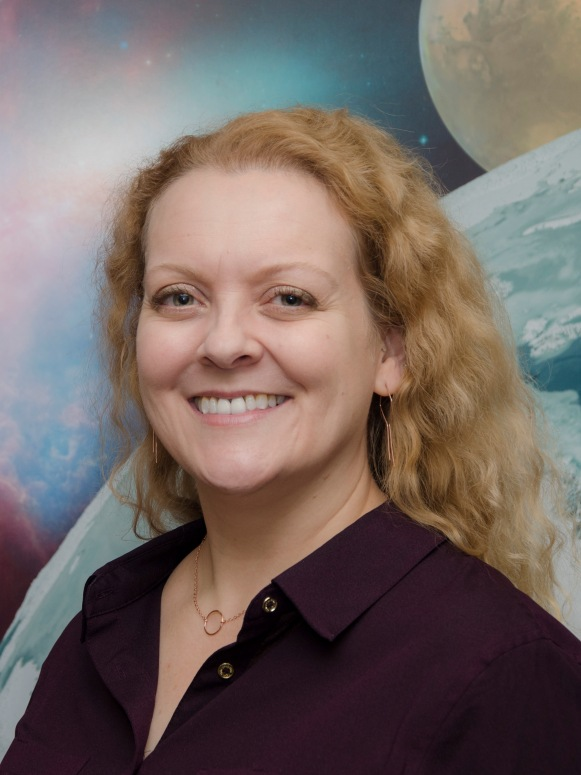
- Carrie Anderson
- Born: Phoenix, Arizona
- Education: Arizona State University; New Mexico State University
- Scientific career
- Fields: Planetary atmospheres
- Workplaces: Goddard Space Flight Center

Carrie Anderson is an American planetary scientist at NASA's Goddard Space Flight Center.

== Education ==
Anderson is from Arizona. She earned a Bachelors in physics from Arizona State University in 2000. She moved to the New Mexico State University for her doctoral studies and graduated in 2006. Upon graduation she became a NASA Postdoctoral Fellow.

== Career ==
Anderson is a planetary astronomer in the Astrochemistry Laboratory at NASA's Goddard Space Flight Center, having joined NASA as a civil servant in 2009. She served as the Associate Chief of the Planetary Systems Laboratory from 2011 to 2016.

Anderson's scientific research focuses on the remote sensing of planetary atmospheres, primarily in the areas of thermal structure and composition, using space- and ground-based data. Her earliest scientific work focused on the exosphere of Mercury (planet). She now performs radiative transfer analyses of the outer planets, including the effects of aerosols and condensates, as well as data analysis techniques in the visible, near-IR, mid-IR, far-IR, and submillimeter spectral regions. Anderson's research also includes transmission spectroscopy measurements of thin ice films using her SPECtroscopy of Titan-Related ice AnaLogs (SPECTRAL) high-vacuum chamber located in her Spectroscopy for Planetary ICes Environments (SPICE) laboratory.

Anderson's more recent research concerns the atmosphere of Saturn's moon Titan, which is, according to NASA, "a model for what the early Earth might have been like." Titan has a thick, nitrogen-dominated atmosphere and is the only world in the solar system other than Earth known to possess stable liquid on its surface." (Titan's seas are not water, however, but methane and ethane.)

In 2015, Anderson reported her discovery of a chemically new, high-altitude ice cloud residing in Titan's south polar stratosphere during Titan's early southern winter season, chemically consistent with co-condensed hydrogen cyanide and benzene. During her 12-year tenure on the Cassini Composite InfraRed Spectrometer (CIRS) team, Anderson also discovered additional ice clouds in Titan's stratosphere, including a co-condensed ice mixture containing hydrogen cyanide and cyanoacetylene, methane ice clouds formed via subsidence in Titan's lower stratosphere, the solid-state photochemical formation of dicyanoacetylene ice – co-condensed with hydrogen cyanide ice, in Titan's early northern spring stratosphere, as well as the discovery that Titan's photochemical aerosol is chemically uniform throughout the atmosphere at altitudes below the stratopause. Anderson has been heavily engaged in operations of the Cassini-Huygens mission in the Saturn system.

Anderson is currently the Deputy Principal Investigator (DPI) on a submillimeter heterodyne spectrometer, aimed at a mission proposal concept to Enceladus. She is also DPI of a joint GSFC/JPL SmallSat mission concept to Venus, with a submillimeter heterodyne spectrometer as the primary instrument. She is also actively engaged in mission design concepts for planetary flight mission opportunities as well as projects involving submillimeter heterodyne spectrometer designs for future planetary flight missions.

Anderson is a member of the American Geophysical Union and the American Astronomical Society's Division for Planetary Sciences.

== Honors and awards ==
- NASA Early Career Achievement Medal – June 2012
- NASA Exceptional Scientific Achievement Medal – July 2015
- NASA Robert H. Goddard Exceptional Group Achievement Award for Mission Support – March 2016
