= Des Anderson =

Association football player from Northern Ireland

Personal information
- Full name: John Desmond Anderson
- Date of birth: 11 September 1940 (age 86)
- Place of birth: Downpatrick, Northern Ireland
- Position: Centre back

Senior career*
Years	Team	Apps	(Gls)
- Cliftonville
- Glenavon
1962–1966	Exeter City	144	(1)
1966–1968	Chesterfield	8	(0)
- Matlock Town

International career
1959-1962	Northern Ireland Amateurs	6	(0)
- * Club domestic league appearances and goals

John Desmond Anderson (born 11 September 1940) is a Northern Irish retired footballer who made over 140 appearances as an outside right in the Football League for Exeter City.

== Career statistics ==
Appearances and goals by club, season and competition
Club	Season	League			FA Cup		League Cup		Total	
Club	Season	Division	Apps	Goals	Apps	Goals	Apps	Goals	Apps	Goals
Chesterfield	1966–67	Fourth Division	7	0	0	0	1	1	8	1
Chesterfield	1967–68	Fourth Division	1	0	0	0	0	0	1	0
Career total			8	0	0	0	1	1	9	1
