= Christy Anderson =

American art historian

Christy Anderson is an architectural historian with a special interest in the buildings of the Renaissance and Baroque. She is currently a professor of Art and Architecture at University of Toronto.

She graduated from Johns Hopkins University with a B.A., from University of Massachusetts Amherst with an M.A. in the History of Art, and from Massachusetts Institute of Technology with a PhD from the School of Architecture in the History, Theory and Criticism of Art, Architecture and Urbanism Program. She taught at Yale University from 1995 until 2004. She has lectured at the Courtauld Institute of Art, and Harvard University.

While at Yale University, she was the recipient of several teaching prizes, including the Sidonie Miskimin Clauss Prize for Teaching Excellence in the Humanities, Yale College (2001), the Sarai Ribicoff Award for the Encouragement of Teaching at Yale College (2001), and the Poorvu Family Prize for Interdisciplinary Teaching at Yale College (1997).

== Awards ==
- 2010 Guggenheim Fellowship
- 2007 Canadian Centre for Architecture Visiting Research Scholar
- 1992–1993 Samuel H. Kress Two-Year Fellowship in the History of Art at a Foreign Institution, Courtauld Institute of Art, University of London
- 1992–1994 Worcester College, Oxford University, research fellow

== Works ==
- "Letter to an Undergraduate", Yale Review of Books, Spring 2004
- British architectural theory, 1540-1750: an anthology of texts, Editors Caroline van Eck, Christy Anderson, Ashgate Publishing, Ltd., 2003, ISBN 9780754603153
- The Built Surface: Architecture and the pictorial arts from antiquity to the Enlightenment, Editors Christy Anderson, Karen Koehler, Ashgate, 2002, ISBN 978-0-7546-0022-0
- Inigo Jones and the classical tradition, Cambridge University Press, 2007, ISBN 978-0-521-82027-1
