= Linda Anderson =

Linda or Lynn Anders(s)on or Andersen is the name of:

- Linda Anderson (artist) (born 1941), American folk artist
- Linda Anderson, character in Beethoven's 2nd
- Lin Anderson, Scottish writer
- Linda Andersson (born 1972), Swedish swimmer
- Linda Andersen (born 1969), Norwegian sailor
- Lynn Anderson (1947–2015), American country singer
