= Maria Frances Anderson =

- Born: Maria Frances Hill; January 30, 1819; Paris, France
- Died: October 13, 1895 (aged 76); Rosemont, Pennsylvania, U.S.
- Occupation: Writer
- Spouse: George W. Anderson (m. 1847)
- Writing career
- Pen name: L. M. N.
- Language: English
- Genres: prose; hymns
- Notable work: "Our country's voice is pleading"

Maria Frances Anderson (pen name, L.M.N.; January 30, 1819 - October 13, 1895) was a 19th-century French-born American writer of prose and hymns. Her hymn, "Our country's voice is pleading", written with four double stanzas in 1848, and published the following year in The Baptist Harp, came into common use.

== Biography ==
Maria Frances Hill was born in Paris, France, on January 30, 1819. Her father, Thomas F. Hill, was a native of Exeter, England.

In 1845, she was baptized at Pittsburgh, Pennsylvania, and united with the Grant Street Baptist church. In April 1847, she married Rev. George W. Anderson, D.D. (1816–1903), of Philadelphia. He was a professor at Bucknell University in Lewisburg, Pennsylvania.

Anderson is the author of a Sunday school book Jessie Carey (1853), and The Baptists in Sweden (1861). A home mission hymn written by Anderson in 1849, was included in many collections of that era. Dr. George Barton Ide, then pastor of the First Baptist church in Philadelphia, had seen some of Anderson's poetical productions in the Christian Chronicle, and as he wished to have a home mission hymn in The Baptist Harp which he was then compiling, he asked her if she would write one in the same measure as Bishop Heber's "From Greenland's icy mountains". Anderson acceded to his request, and her hymn, "Christian Union", was sung for the first time at a home mission meeting in the First Baptist Church, Philadelphia. In the Calvary Selection (892) and the Baptist Hymnal (594), this hymn has three stanzas. In The Baptist Harp, Anderson has another hymn (112).

Maria Frances Anderson died October 13, 1895, in Rosemont, Pennsylvania.

== Selected works ==
=== Books ===
- In Colonial Days: A Tale of Rhode Island and Providence Plantations, 1886 (text)
- Jessie Carey, 1853
- Old Bristol: A Story of the Early English Baptists, 1860 (text)
- The Baptists in Sweden, 1861 (text)

=== Hymns ===
- "Christian Union", in Baptist Harp, Philadelphia, 1849
- "Home Missions", in Woman in sacred song, 1888
- "Our country's voice is pleading", in The Baptist Harp, Philadelphia, 1849, with four double stanzas.
- "Yes, she is gone, yet do not thou"
