= Joshua Anderson (serial killer) =

American serial killer (born 1987)

Joshua Julius Anderson
- Anderson in 2007
- Born: June 17, 1987 (age 39)
- Convictions: First degree murder (4 counts); First degree arson Assault with a deadly weapon
- Penalty: Life imprisonment without parole

Details
- Victims: 4–5
- Span of crimes: 2006–2007
- Country: United States
- State: Oklahoma
- Weapons: Shotgun; Revolver
- Date apprehended: February 2, 2007
- Imprisoned at: Joseph Harp Correctional Center

Joshua Julius Anderson (born June 17, 1987) is an American serial killer who killed at least four people in a three-month timeframe between 2006 and 2007 in Tulsa, Oklahoma. He was arrested on the same day as his final two murders, and confessed soon afterwards. He was sentenced to four life terms and an additional 35 years imprisonment.

== Early life ==
Joshua Julius Anderson was born on June 17, 1987. At age 15, he was accused of shooting with intent to kill in Muskogee. However, the warrant was recalled less than a month later. In June 2005, he was charged with kidnapping, concealing stolen property, and domestic assault and battery. As part of a plea deal, he pleaded guilty to the domestic assault and battery, but had the kidnapping and stolen property charges dismissed. Anderson was sentenced to 90 days in jail. One month later, he was charged with shooting another person, but the case was dismissed a month later due to weak witness testimony.

== Murders ==
All of the murders were committed within a few blocks of each other in a neighborhood just north of downtown Tulsa. The area was known for its drug problem. Anderson, who lived near the murder scenes, was known as the neighborhood bully, and caused fear throughout the town. At the time of his arrest, Anderson had committed a third of Tulsa's homicides that year.

=== Evaristo Tovias Jr. ===
On November 5, 2006, 34-year-old Evaristo Tovias Jr., armed with a knife, was looking for drugs. A fight between him and A.C. Anderson, Joshua's brother, subsequently developed, during which they beat up Tovias. Joshua then produced a double-barreled shotgun and fired at Tovias once, hitting him twice. He then stole the knife from Tovias' body because he liked the way it looked, and fled the scene, shotgun in hand.

=== Christopher Moderow and David Gilbert ===
On January 23, 2007, 30-year-old Christopher Moderow, wanting drugs, walked with Joshua and A.C. to a drug dealer. There, an argument developed, and Moderow retrieved an ice pick. Joshua fatally shot him with a .22-caliber revolver and robbed his body of $3 before fleeing in his brother's car.

On the same day, witnesses saw Anderson shoot David Gilbert, 26, to death for revenge, as the two had had an altercation earlier that day. However, he was never charged with that killing due to insufficient evidence.

=== The Hobbs family ===
On February 2, 2007, A.C. told Joshua that 52-year-old Herbert Hobbs had money in his pocket. Joshua, armed with a revolver, went to the Hobbs home with the intention of robbing Herbert. Upon arriving at the residence, he tied up Herbert and his 69-year-old mother, Rosemary, and stole $300. Joshua then left the house, but returned because the victims had seen his face. Although they had freed themselves, Joshua threatened them with his revolver. At gunpoint, he forced the two to engage in sexual acts with each other before fatally shooting them. Afterwards, he ate part of Rosemary's brain. He proceeded to douse the house in gasoline and set it ablaze before fleeing.

== Legal proceedings ==
On the same day as the final two murders, he was arrested for first-degree rape in Muskogee County, which he had been wanted for since late November. Investigators quickly connected him to the murders, and he was charged with four counts of first-degree murder, one count of first-degree arson, and one count of assault and battery with a deadly weapon. Anderson confessed to the crimes after being shown a tape in which his brother blamed him. During the confession, he provided details only the perpetrator could know, such as the location and position of the bodies. Because he was intellectually disabled, prosecutors decided not to seek the death penalty. They also decided to try him separately for each murder.

Anderson's trial for the Hobbs' murders began on October 22, 2008. Testimony lasted two days. His attorney, a public defender, argued during closing arguments that there was no physical evidence linking Anderson to the murders, nor was any evidence presented of the fire being started with an accelerant. After two hours of deliberation, the jury of seven women and five men found Anderson guilty on all charges. He was given two life sentences, as well an additional 25 years for arson. On December 8, 2008, he pleaded guilty to the murders of Tovias and Moderow and assault with a deadly weapon. He was given two more life sentences and an additional 10-years-imprisonment. He is now serving his sentences at the Lexington Assessment & Reception Center (LARC) in Lexington, Oklahoma.

== See also ==
- List of serial killers in the United States
- List of people sentenced to more than one life imprisonment
