= Karen Anderson =

Karen Anderson may refer to:

- Karen Anderson (writer) (1932–2018), American fantasy writer
- Karen Anderson (athlete) (born 1938), American javelin thrower
- Karen Anderson (squash player) (born 1971), Jamaican squash player
- Karen Anderson (politician), member of the North Dakota House of Representatives
