= Lory Anderson =

Paraguayan actress, model and TV host

Loreley Anderson
- Born: Loreley Anderson; September 6, 1982 (age 43); Paraguay
- Occupations: Actress, model, TV host
- Years active: 1996–present
- Known for: Juego de Niños, Ánimo Juan, De mil amores
- Television: Juego de Niños, Blats, Lory Club, Lory Toons, Lory Show, Código Fama, Rojito, Ánimo Juan, De mil amores

Loreley Anderson, known professionally as Lory Anderson (born September 6, 1982) is a Paraguayan actress, model and TV host.

She made her television program at the age of 14 in Juego de Niños on Tevedos. This was followed by appearances in Blats and Lory Club on Unicanal, and Lory Toons, Lory Show and Código Fama on Telefuturo. In 2005 she began presenting the reality show Rojito on Canal 13. Her career as an actress made considerable progress in 2006, when she appeared with Arnaldo André in the Ánimo Juan series, transmitted by Telefuturo. In 2008 took part in the dance contest Menchi el Show, where she was third finalist, and the following year she starred in the television series De mil amores.
