= Arnold Anderson =

Arnold Anderson may refer to:

- Arnold Anderson (athlete) (1912–1996), New Zealand track and field athlete
- Arnold Anderson (scientist), Six Nations Tuscarora tribal member who worked with Albert Einstein as a chemical engineer on the Manhattan Project
- C. Arnold Anderson (1907–1990), American educator and scholar
- Arnold Anderson (baseball), played in 1938 St. Louis Cardinals season
