= Brett Anderson (disambiguation) =

Brett Anderson (born 1967) is an English singer-songwriter.

Brett Anderson may also refer to:

== People ==
- Brett Anderson (American musician) (born 1979), American vocalist for The Donnas
- Brett Anderson (baseball) (born 1988), American Major League Baseball player
- Brett Anderson (rugby league) (born 1986), Australian rugby league footballer

== Other ==
- Brett Anderson (album), first solo album by the English singer-songwriter

== See also ==
- Bret Anderson (born 1975), Canadian football player
