= Drew Anderson =

Drew Anderson may refer to:

- Drew Anderson (American football) (born 1995), American football player
- Drew Anderson (outfielder) (born 1981), American baseball outfielder
- Drew Anderson (pitcher) (born 1994), American baseball pitcher
