= Lily Anderson (campaigner) =

Irish social and peace campaigner, and communist

Lilian Anderson
- Born: 1922; North Belfast, Ireland
- Died: August 1982 (aged 59–60); People's Republic of Bulgaria
- Occupation: Social campaigner
- Political party: Communist Party of Ireland
- Spouse: Theo Anderson
- Children: 7

Lilian "Lily" Anderson (1922 – August 1982) was an Irish social campaigner and communist, known for her leadership of the Nursery Mother's Action Campaign. Joining the Communist Party of Ireland in 1942, Anderson served on the parties Women’s Committee and the Education and Social Services Committee.

== Biography ==
Lilian Anderson was born in 1922 in North Belfast. In 1942, she joined the Communist Party of Ireland, sitting on the subcommittees for women, social services and education for many years. During the 1960s, she was most known for her campaigning for better nursery facilities. She was involved in the Mothers' Club, which was instrumental in the formation of the Nursery Mothers’ Action Campaign from 1964 to 1966 as her children attended the associated Frederick Street nursery school. She served as the chairman of the Mothers' Club, playing a key role in this campaign, noted for her condemnation of the closing of nurseries that had been opened during World War II. Her argument was that under the 1947 Education Act, such nursery facilities must be provided and was scathing of the attitude that nurseries were used by "lazy mothers dumping their children in nurseries". The campaign resulted in nurseries being opened at the Victoria Barrack Estate and New Lodge in Belfast.

She was also an active campaigner in the peace movements in Belfast. She married Theo Anderson, and the couple had seven children. When the family moved to Newtownabbey, she helped in the foundation of a nursery class in the Whitehouse Primary School. Anderson died while on a family holiday in People's Republic of Bulgaria in August 1982 in a car accident.

Two books about Anderson where published National Women's Committee of the Communist Party Of Ireland, Portrait of a Communist Woman: Lily Anderson in 1982 and Portrait Of A Communist Woman: A Tribute To Lily Anderson in 1987.
