= Wayne Anderson =

Wayne Anderson may refer to:

- Wayne D. Anderson (1930–2013), American college basketball coach
- Wayne Anderson (politician) (born 1953 or 1954), Canadian politician in Alberta
- Wayne Anderson (racing driver, born 1946), American stock car racing driver and team owner
- Wayne Anderson (racing driver, born 1968), American race car driver
- Wayne Anderson (swimmer) (born 1945), American former swimmer

== See also ==
- Wayne Andersen (born 1945), former United States federal judge
