= Charlie Anderson (Australian footballer) =

Australian rules footballer, born 1903

Personal information
- Full name: Charles Victor Roddan Anderson
- Born: 19 August 1903; Rosedale, Victoria
- Died: 31 January 1985 (aged 81); Prahran, Victoria
- Original team: Rosedale
- Height: 183 cm (6 ft 0 in)
- Weight: 77 kg (170 lb)

Playing career^{1}
Years	Club	Games (Goals)
1924	Carlton	1 (0)
1925–1926	South Melbourne	11 (2)
1926	Richmond	3 (0)
1927	Footscray	1 (0)
Total		16 (2)
- ^{1} Playing statistics correct to the end of 1927.

Charles Victor Roddan Anderson (19 August 1903 – 31 January 1985) was an Australian rules footballer who played with Carlton, South Melbourne, Richmond and Footscray in the Victorian Football League (VFL).

In a five-season career, Anderson played with four clubs. The Gippsland recruit made his only appearance for Carlton in the opening round of the 1924 VFL season. He then joined South Melbourne and kicked the only two goals of his career in his first game at his new club, against Essendon. It was one of eight games he played that year and he added another three in 1926. Later in the 1926 season he crossed to Richmond, where he played just three games. He finished his career at Footscray, who were competing in just their third VFL season.
