= Wright-Humason School for the Deaf =

Location
- 42 West 76th Street; New York, New York; 40°46′46.2″N 73°58′33.6″W

Information
- Type: Public
- History: In 1894, Keller and Sullivan moved to New York to attend the Wright-Humason School for the Deaf. Founded by John Dutton Wright and Thomas A. Humason in 1894.

Wright-Humason School for the Deaf in New York City was a specialist school attended by Helen Keller from 1894 to 1896.
