= Lorna Anderson =

Scottish soprano

- Born: Glasgow, Scotland
- Genres: Classical, Baroque
- Occupation(s): Soprano, Vocal Teacher

Lorna Anderson is a Scottish soprano from Glasgow, noted for her Baroque recitals.

Anderson attended the Royal Conservatoire of Scotland with Patricia MacMahon and the Royal College of Music. She has performed with the Scottish Chamber Orchestra, BBC Philharmonic Orchestra, BBC Symphony Orchestra, The Bach Choir, the Royal Liverpool Philharmonic Orchestra, the New World Symphony Orchestra, Houston Symphony Orchestra and the National Symphony Orchestra of Washington, and the St. James Baroque Players, London Baroque, London Classical Players, La Chapelle Royale and others. She has an affinity for early opera and has toured with The Academy of Ancient Music. Operatic roles include Servilia in Mozart's La Clemenza di Tito with the Royal Flanders Philharmonic Orchestra and Morgana in Handel's Alcina at the Halle Handel Festival among others. She has recorded The Fairy-Queen with Harry Christophers, Haydn Masses with Richard Hickox and Lament for Mary Queen of Scots. She teaches at the Royal Welsh College of Music & Drama and Oxenfoord Summer School.
