= Geraint Anderson =

English journalist (born 1972)

Geraint Anderson (born 1972 in Notting Hill, London), is a former City of London utilities sector analyst and newspaper columnist, best known for his "City Boy" column in The London Paper.

== Early life ==
The third son of the Labour Party politician Donald Anderson, Baron Anderson of Swansea and his missionary wife Dorothy, herself the daughter of Bolivian missionaries, he was raised at his parents' London home in Notting Hill. Anderson was educated at Fox School in Notting Hill and Latymer Upper School in Hammersmith. Taking a gap year in Asia, Anderson says he lived the hippy life and smoked cannabis. He then undertook a degree in history at Queens' College, University of Cambridge, and then an MA in revolutions at Sussex University.

== Banking ==
In 1996, Anderson's older brother Huw, who worked as fund manager with the Dutch investment bank ABN Amro, arranged an interview for him. In a later interview with Al Jazeera, Anderson mused that, at that time, he knew nothing about either finance or the City. Anderson was resultantly employed as a utilities analyst, composing models of publicly listed companies. Within five years, his salary had increased from £24,000 to £120,000 and his first three years of bonuses were £14,000, £55,000 and £140,000. In 1997, he moved to Société Générale and, in 1999, to Commerzbank.

In 2000, Anderson joined Dresdner Kleinwort. He was named top stock-picker two years running and appointed joint team leader of the utilities research team. His team became number two in the utilities sector and Anderson was personally judged the fourth highest-ranked analyst (out of around 100).

== City Boy ==
Anderson started writing his "City Boy" column in the third quarter of 2006 for The London Paper, which became a popular piece with some readers of the newly launched free newspaper. On 18 June 2008, it was revealed that Anderson was "City Boy". In the following week he published his first book, Cityboy: Beer And Loathing In The Square Mile.

A second book, Cityboy: 50 Ways to Survive the Crunch, was published in November 2008. In 2010, Anderson revealed that he was working on a third book, Just Business. It is about a man who writes an anonymous column for a London-based newspaper, breaks into his boss's computer and discovers a major crime.

== Works by Anderson ==
=== Books ===
- Geraint Anderson (2008). Cityboy: Beer and Loathing in the Square Mile. Headline Book Publishing. ISBN 978-0755346165.
- Geraint Anderson (2008). Fifty Ways to Survive the Crunch. Headline Book Publishing. ISBN 978-0755319466.
- Geraint Anderson (2011). Just Business. Headline Book Publishing. ISBN 978-0755381722.
- Geraint Anderson (2012). Payback Time. Headline Book Publishing. ISBN 978-0755381753.

=== Filmography ===
- Fish Finger Sandwich (short film, 2017)
- Trick or Treat (2019)
