= Warren Anderson =

Warren Anderson may refer to:

- Warren Anderson (Australian businessman) (born 1942), Australian businessman
- Warren Anderson (American businessman) (1921–2014), former chairman of Union Carbide
- Warren Anderson (American football) (born 1955), former American football wide receiver
- Warren Anderson (ice hockey) (born 1952), Canadian Olympic ice hockey player
- Warren M. Anderson (1915–2007), former New York politician
- Warren Melville Anderson (1894–1973), Australian major-general
- Warren Anderson, a character in the film 8mm

== See also ==
- Philip Warren Anderson (1923–2020), American physicist
