= Miller Anderson =

Miller Anderson may refer to:

- J. Miller Anderson & Co., an Adelaide, South Australia, retail drapery business
- Miller Anderson (musician) (born 1945), British blues guitarist and singer
- Miller Anderson (diver) (1922–1965), American diver
