= Joyce Anderson (artist) =

Canadian painter (1932–2022)

- Born: April 10, 1932; Winnipeg, Manitoba, Canada
- Died: November 21, 2022 (aged 90); Saint Boniface Hospital, Winnipeg, Manitoba, Canada
- Occupations: Painter and art teacher
- Website: joyceandersonartist.com

Joyce Anderson (April 10, 1932 – November 21, 2022) was a Canadian painter and art teacher.

== Early life ==
Anderson was born to Pieter and Sabina Besse (née Nieuwenburg) in Winnipeg, Manitoba, on April 10, 1932. She began painting when she was 12 or 13. She never trained formally as a painter. Anderson began painting seriously in 1952.

== Career ==
Anderson became a high school art teacher in the 1970s. She taught at Tec Voc high school for 21 years, until 1994.

Anderson's paintings have been displayed at the Manitoba Legislature, the Winnipeg Police Museum, and the Winnipeg Art Gallery. Towards the end of her life, Anderson showcased her work and held auctions at the River Ridge Retirement Residence in Winnipeg. She also taught art classes there and at the Fort Rouge Community Club.

== Personal life ==
Anderson was pre-deceased by her husband of 44 years, police officer Bertil Anderson. They had two children. She died on November 21, 2022, at age 90 at Saint Boniface Hospital in Winnipeg.
