= Ruthadell Anderson =

American artist (1922–2018)

- Born: January 21, 1922; San Jose, California, U.S.
- Died: March 8, 2018 (aged 96); Honolulu, Hawaii, U.S.
- Education: San Jose State University, University of Hawaiʻi

Ruthadell Anderson (née Isham, January 21, 1922 – March 8, 2018) was an American fiber artist. She was known for her sculptures and textiles.

== Biography ==
Ruthadell Adell Isham was born on January 21 1922 in San Jose, California. Her first weaving lesson was while she was in high school. She attended San Jose State College (now San Jose State University), where she earned a B.A. degree in 1943. She earned a M.F.A. degree in 1964 from the University of Hawaiʻi.

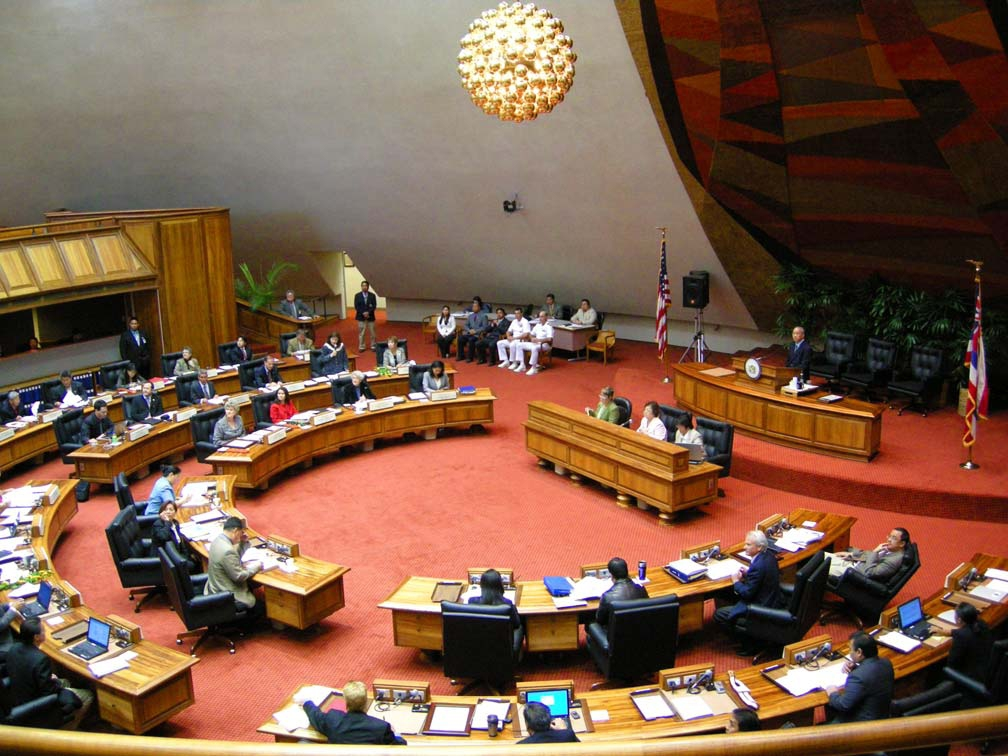
The Hawaii House of Representatives, with Anderson's tapestry at right.

Her work is included in the permanent collection of the Smithsonian American Art Museum.

Anderson created textile screens for the Robert Thurston Memorial Chapel at Punahou School, a building designed and built in 1966 by architect Vladimir Ossipoff. Two of her tapestries are installed in the Hawaii State House: one in the chamber of the Hawaii House of Representatives, and the other in the chamber of the Hawaii Senate. Each of the tapestries is forty feet tall, and required the work of 16 weavers over three years.

She died in Honolulu, Hawaii on March 8, 2018, at the age of 96.
