= Samuel Anderson (Florida politician) =

American farmer and state legislator from Florida

Samuel Anderson (March 10, 1841 - September 8, 1908) was an American farmer, soldier, and state legislator from Florida. He represented Duval County, Florida in the Florida House of Representatives in 1887.

He was born in Fort Moniac, Florida. He served in the United States Colored Infantry.

== See also ==
- John H. Anderson (Florida politician)
- Reconstruction era
- African American officeholders from the end of the Civil War until before 1900
