= Caleb J. Anderson =

Swedish politician (1910–1996)

Caleb Johan Anderson (31 October 1910–26 June 1996) was a Swedish Social Democrat and an important adviser to Prime Minister Olof Palme, especially concerning foreign policy where he was a harsh critic of the Vietnam War, and a supporter of the Cuban Revolution. Anderson also translated books by Franz Kafka to Swedish.

In 1942, Anderson translated works for the Swedish–German Friendship Association magazine.

== Literary works ==
- Vår otrygga värld. (1965).
- I denna revolutionära epok: utrikespolitiska essäer 1966-1970. (1970).
- Den globala obalansen: om olja, supermakter och imperialism. (1974).
- Caleb J. Anderson: Palmes okände rådgivare: en sammanställning av Caleb J. Andersons viktigaste artiklar - urval, inledning och kommentarer av Anders Ferm. (1997).
