= Lucy Anderson =

Lucy Anderson may refer to:

- Lucy Anderson (musician) (1795–1878), English pianist
- Lucy Anderson (politician) (born 1965), British lawyer, and former member of the European Parliament
- Lucy Anderson (rugby union) (born 1991), New Zealand rugby union player
- Lucy Hicks Anderson (1886–1954), American transgender socialite, chef, hostess, and philanthropist
