= Eduardo Belmont Anderson =

Peruvian billionaire businessman

- Born: November 20, 1945; Lima, Perú
- Education: University of North Carolina at Chapel Hill
- Occupation: Businessman
- Known for: Owner of Belcorp
- Spouse: Luisa Maria del Rosario Graña Podesta
- Children: 3

Eduardo Belmont Anderson (born November 20, 1945) is a Peruvian billionaire businessman. He is the owner and president of Belcorp, a cosmetics company that sells its products through door-to-door sales and operates in 16 Latin American countries and the United States. In 2026, he was worth an estimated $1.5 to 2 billion, making him the 80th wealthiest person in Latin America.

Anderson and his brother Fernando previously co-owned the cosmetics company Yanbal. In 1988, the brothers separated their business interests. Each went on to lead his own cosmetics company.
