= Joyce Anderson =

American woodworker, furniture maker (1923–2014)

- Born: Joyce Rinehart; November 24, 1923; Plainfield, New Jersey, U.S.
- Died: April 20, 2014 (aged 90)
- Other name: Joyce Rinehart Anderson
- Education: Dickinson College, New York University
- Spouse: Edgar M. Anderson (m. 1946–2014; death)

Joyce Anderson (née Joyce Rinehart; November 24, 1923 – April 20, 2014) was an American furniture designer and woodworker. Anderson is known for her professional partnership with her husband, Edgar M. Anderson. Together, their works in wood are regarded as early examples of the American Craft movement, specifically for the state of New Jersey. Anderson was one of the first professional female woodworkers in the United States.

== Early life and education ==
Joyce Anderson was born on November 24, 1923, in Plainfield, New Jersey, and she grew up in West Orange. Anderson attended Dickinson College, in Carlisle, Pennsylvania. Later, upon receiving a fellowship from the Sloan Foundation in New York City, Anderson attended New York University (NYU). At NYU, she earned a master's degree in public affairs and regional studies.

Anderson and her future husband, Edgar, met and dated in high school. Following Edgar's return from overseas, the couple was reunited and were married in 1946. Following the Andersons’ marriage in 1946, the couple moved to Chicago so that Edgar could study building construction at Chicago Technical College.

== Woodworking ==
While Anderson enjoyed economics and public affairs, she was faced with limited prospects when she had to find work quickly following the couple's move to Chicago. While reconsidering her career choices, Edgar started making furniture and eventually needed extra help. During this time Joyce became interested in design and made the decision to join her husband on the path to becoming a designer and builder. Thus began a lifelong collaboration in wood.

The Andersons were based in New Jersey for the entirety of their careers, following their purchase of land just outside Morristown, New Jersey, in 1950. The couple used wood from the acreage's walnut, oak, birch, and ash trees to create some of their earliest custom-built furniture.

When Joyce and Edgar began their business, much of their work consisted of repairing or refinishing, rather than designing. However, in doing so, they learned a great deal about future design decisions that they would need to make. Over time, the Andersons notoriety grew and they became recognized designers, no longer unknown repairers.

Joyce was one of the first professional female woodturners in the U.S. Starting in the early 1950s, she used woodturning as a practical way to generate income for her and her husband's woodworking business. She sold her turned pieces—ranging from bowls and plates to egg cups, candlesticks, and furniture components—at local and regional craft fairs. While Edgar handled other parts of the business, such as logging and milling wood from their property, Joyce was responsible for all turned work.

As their notoriety grew, they gained several patrons that would consistently support their work through commissions for years to come. One such couple, Sandy and Louis Grotta (he was the former president of Paige Electric), discovered the Andersons’ work on a visit to the Museum of Modern Art in the late 1950s. Sandy Grotta stated that upon seeing their work she fell in love and promptly “came home and got rid of all [her] furniture.” Upon discovering the Andersons, Sandy Grotta's passion for collecting was ignited and she and her husband Louis set off on a six-decade long journey of prolific arts patronage. There are many examples of other collectors who supported the Andersons' innovating work for decades through specific commissions and purchases of other works.

In 1959, the couple took on the project of building their own house and workshop on the property. They completed each task on their own, from digging the foundation, to installing the heating and plumbing, to crafting the built-in storage and furniture. In 2008, Joyce and Edgar made an agreement with the Harding Land Trust, Harding Township, and New Jersey Audubon to preserve the house after their deaths. According to the agreement, the New Jersey Audubon will convert the house, studio, and buildings on the property into a museum.

In 1992, Joyce and Edgar Anderson were both created Fellows of the American Craft Council.

== Death ==
In the 1990s, following decades of woodworking, Anderson had to stop turning wood due to a severe cough she had developed years before. What was originally thought to be a wood allergy turned out to be chronic obstructive pulmonary disease. Anderson died on April 20, 2014, at age 90. Her husband, Edgar, died the next year, on January 3, 2015, at age 92.
