= Avril Anderson =

English composer

- Born: 10 June 1953 (age 72); Southsea, Hampshire, England
- Occupations: Composer, music educator
- Employer(s): Royal College of Music, University of Notre Dame
- Known for: Co-director of Sounds Positive
- Spouse: David Sutton-Anderson

Avril Anderson (born 10 June 1953) is an English music educator and composer. She has composed for orchestra, choir, chamber ensemble, solo instruments, and organ. She worked at the Royal College of Music in London, and is an adjunct professor at the University of Notre Dame in London. Anderson is co-director of contemporary music ensemble Sounds Positive.

== Biography ==
Avril Anderson was born in Southsea, Hampshire, England in 1953. In 1972 she entered the Royal College of Music where she studied with Humphrey Searle and John Lambert. In 1996 she continued her studies at the New England Conservatory with David del Tredici in New York City.

Anderson won the Cobbett Prize for composition, and her music has been performed in Europe, Australia and the United States. Anderson has directed educational projects, and took a position at the Royal College of Music in 2001. She is co-artistic director with her husband David Sutton-Anderson of contemporary music ensemble Sounds Positive, which has performed more than a hundred premieres of works by British composers. Anderson was Composer-in-Residence for the Young Place London Contemporary Dance School from 1990 until 2000. She is an adjunct professor at University of Notre Dame, London programme, where she has taught since 1997.

In 1997 Anderson was the Performing Right Society Composer-in-Education.

Anderson's music is published by Oxford University Press, Bardic, Andresier Edition and ABRSM.

== Works ==
Anderson has composed for orchestra, chorus, instrumental ensembles, solo instruments and voice. Selected works include:

- The grass is sleeping
- The Lone Piper
- Lines in the Sand
- Le Carillon de Cythère

=== Discography ===
- Contemporary British Organ Music volume 2 Audio CD, 2010, ASIN: B003U4GBGA SFZ Music
- Spectrum 2
- Prime Cuts
