= Isaac Anderson =

Isaac Anderson may refer to:

- Isaac Anderson (Pennsylvania politician) (1760–1838), member of the U.S. House of Representatives from Pennsylvania, officer in the American Revolution
- Isaac H. Anderson (1834–1906), slave who became a wealthy businessman, politician and religious leader in the U.S. state of Georgia
- Isaac L. Anderson (1780–1857), Presbyterian minister and founder of Maryville College
