= Stephen Anderson =

Stephen, Steven or Steve Anderson may refer to:

== Arts and entertainment ==
- Steve Anderson (author) (born 1966), American author and translator
- Steve Anderson (bass guitarist), British musician
- Steve Anderson (director), director of The Big Empty and Fuck
- Steve Anderson (musician) (born 1969), musician and songwriter
- Steve F. Anderson (born 1963), associate professor and founding director of the Ph.D. program in Media Arts and Practice at the USC School of Cinematic Arts
- Stephen Anderson (artist) (born 1969/70), American artist
- Stephen Milburn Anderson (1948–2015), American film director/producer/writer
- Stephen P. Anderson (born 1967), American musician, songwriter and expressionist painter

== Sports ==
- Steven Anderson (born 1985), Scottish footballer
- Steve Anderson (hurdler) (1906–1988), American Olympic athlete
- Stephen Anderson (Australian footballer) (born 1968), Collingwood AFL footballer
- Steve Anderson (basketball) (born 1982), NBA basketball referee
- Steve Anderson (footballer, born 1946), Scottish footballer
- Steve Anderson (karate) (1955–2020), American karate competitor
- Steve Anderson (rugby union coach) (born 1963), assistant coach of Glasgow Rugby
- Stephen Anderson (American football) (born 1993), American football player
- Stephen Anderson (bowls) (born 1958), Australian lawn bowler

== Others ==
- Steve Anderson (open media activist), Canadian open media advocate, writer, video producer, and social media consultant
- Stephen H. Anderson (born 1932), U.S. federal judge
- Stephen R. Anderson (1943–2025), American linguist
- Stephen Wayne Anderson (1953–2002), American murderer executed in 2002
- Steven Anderson (pastor) (born 1981), American Baptist pastor
- Steve Anderson (police officer), chief of the Metropolitan Nashville Police Department

== See also ==
- Stone Cold Steve Austin (Steven Anderson, born 1964), American actor, producer, and retired professional wrestler
