= Amy Anderson =

Amy Anderson may refer to:

- Amy Anderson (comedian) (born 1972), Korean-American comedian and actress
- Amy Anderson (golfer) (born 1992), American professional golfer
- Amy Bishop Anderson (born 1965), convicted of the 2010 University of Alabama in Huntsville shooting
- Sailor Mercury, a character in Sailor Moon, also known as Amy Anderson
