= Vernon Andy Anderson =

Vernon Andy Anderson BD, PhD
- Church: Presbyterian Church in the United States of America

Personal details
- Born: August 23, 1896 Chicago, Illinois
- Died: 1999 (aged 102–103)
- Denomination: Presbyterian
- Occupation: Missionary and minister
- Education: Alabama Presbyterian College
- Alma mater: Presbyterian Theological Seminary and Southern Baptist Theological Seminary

Vernon Andy Anderson (August 23, 1896 – 1999) was an American Presbyterian missionary. Posted to the Belgian Congo in 1921 he was one of the first missionaries to live among the Baluba-lubilashi sub-group of the Baluba people. He studied their society and helped to revise an early Tshiluba-English dictionary. Anderson later served as interim General Secretary of the Congo Protestant Council, a legal representative for the American Presbyterian Congo Mission and an inspector of its schools. He returned to the United States in 1959 and became a minister in Texas.

== Early life ==
Anderson was born in Chicago, Illinois, on August 23, 1896, but his family moved soon afterwards to Alabama. Anderson graduated from the Alabama Presbyterian College in 1917 and in 1920 received a Bachelor of Divinity degree from the Presbyterian Theological Seminary in Louisville, Kentucky.

== Missionary work ==
Anderson joined the American Presbyterian Congo Mission after graduation and was posted to the Kasaï region of the Belgian Congo. Anderson lived amongst the Baluba people from 1921 to 1946, and was one of the first missionaries to work with the Baluba-lubilashi sub-group.

During his time with the Baluba Anderson studied their society and, in 1942, received a PhD degree from the Southern Baptist Theological Seminary for a dissertation titled Witchcraft in Africa: a missionary problem. In this work he noted that most accused witches were women over the age of 55 and were at risk of being murdered by vigilantes. For seven years Anderson chaired a committee that revised an early edition of a Tshiluba-English dictionary.

Anderson afterwards served as interim General Secretary of the Congo Protestant Council in Leopoldville for two years and from 1947 served on the Belgian government's Commission for the Protection of Indigenous People. He also acted as legal representative for the American Presbyterian Congo Mission in 1948. Anderson also served a 10-year term as that mission's inspector of schools from 1949.

== Return to the United States ==
Anderson returned to the United States in 1959. He wrote a book entitled Still Led in Triumph that was published in Nashville, Tennessee later that year. This was a sequel to Led in Triumph by Ethel Taylor Wharton. In 1960 Anderson was awarded an honorary Doctor of Divinity degree by Davidson College, North Carolina and thereafter served as an associate minister of the First Presbyterian Church of Dallas, Texas. He retired in 1966, after which he remained in Texas and died in 1999.
