= Aaron Anderson =

Aaron Anderson may refer to:

- Aaron Anderson (Medal of Honor) (1811–1886), Union Navy sailor and Medal of Honor recipient
- Aaron Anderson (basketball) (born 1991), American basketball player
- Aaron Anderson (soccer) (born 2000), Australian professional soccer player
- Aaron Anderson (American football) (born 2002), American football player
