= Betty Lise Anderson =

American electrical engineer

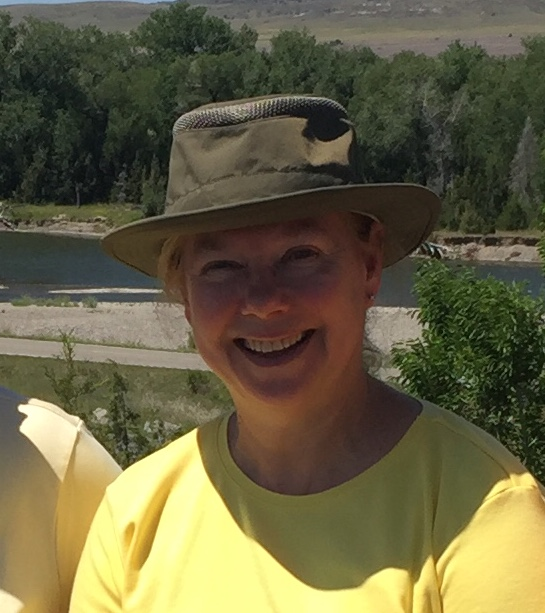
- Education: Syracuse University; University of Vermont
- Scientific career
- Fields: Photonics, semiconductors

Betty Lise Anderson is an American electrical engineer. She has been a professor at the Ohio State University since 1990. She is a Fellow of SPIE, and of the Institute of Electrical and Electronics Engineers.

== Education ==
- 1978 - Bachelors of Science in Electrical Engineering (Syracuse University)
- 1988 - Masters in Science (University of Vermont)
- 1990 - Ph.D. in Materials Science and Electrical Engineering (University of Vermont)

== Early career ==
Anderson began her career as a teacher at an elementary school, where she worked for two years.

== Later career ==
After going back to and graduating with her Ph.D., Anderson has been part of The Ohio State University, where she has held various positions, including Assistant Professor, and currently Professor, since 2004.

== Research interests ==
Anderson's research interests include laser diodes, interferometry, optoelectronic devices, fiber sensing, optical interconnection, and optical multiplexing.

== Publications ==
Betty Lise Anderson owns co-authorship of "Fundamentals of Semiconductor Devices," which has seen both first and second editions published by McGraw-Hill in 2005 and 2017. Anderson has made contributions to peer-reviewed journals in areas such as optical delay devices, photonic switches, and spatial coherence measurements. Some publications include her work on optical true-time delay devices, demonstrated through her papers in prestigious journals like the Journal of Lightwave Technology and Applied Optics. Anderson's research has also delved into practical applications, as seen in her investigations into laser diode effects under gamma radiation and spatial coherence modulation for free space communication. Anderson has also done work on microbend fiber optic sensors and vertical cavity ring lasers.

== Awards and recognition ==
- 2022 - National Science Board Public Service Award
- 2015 - Fellow of SPIE
- 2014 - Women in Engineering Faculty Award for Outreach and Engagement (Ohio State University)
- 2006 - Outstanding Woman in Technology: Top Contributor to the Advancement of Technology Award (TechColumbus, now Rev1 Ventures)
