= Brent Anderson =

Brent Anderson may refer to:

- Brent Anderson (comics) (born 1955), American comics artist
- Brent Anderson (singer) (born 1988), American country music singer
- Brent Anderson (rugby union) (born 1960), New Zealand rugby union player
- Brent Anderson (Mississippi politician) (born 1972), American politician
- Brent F. Anderson (1932–2013), American politician in Utah
