= Donald Anderson =

Donald or Don Anderson may refer to:

- Donald Clive Anderson (1897–1957), English military consultant and historian
- Donald B. Anderson (1904–1956), justice of the Idaho Supreme Court
- Donald M. Anderson (1915–1995), American artist and designer
- Sir Don Anderson (public servant) (1917–1975), Australian public servant
- Donald Anderson, Baron Anderson of Swansea (born 1939), British politician
- Donald Thomas Anderson (born 1939), English zoologist
- Donald K. Anderson (1920–2009), Royal Canadian Air Force war artist
- Donald Anderson (Metal Gear), a character from the video game Metal Gear Solid
- Don Anderson (American football) (born 1963), American football player
- Don A. Anderson (1934–2022), American politician and businessman
- Don L. Anderson (1933–2014), American geophysicist
