= Tim Anderson =

Tim Anderson may refer to:

- Tim Anderson (athlete) (1925–2017), British former pole vaulter
- Tim Anderson (defensive back) (born 1949), American football defensive back
- Tim Anderson (RAF officer) (born 1957), Royal Air Force officer
- Tim Anderson (musician) (born 1977), American musician, songwriter and music producer
- Tim Anderson (cricketer) (born 1978), New Zealand cricketer
- Tim Anderson (defensive tackle) (born 1980), American football defensive tackle
- Tim Anderson (baseball) (born 1993), American baseball shortstop
- Tim Anderson (political economist) (born 1953), Australian academic and author
- Tim Anderson (Nebraska politician), Nebraska state legislator
- Tim Anderson (Virginia politician), Virginia state legislator
- Tim Anderson (programmer) (born 1954), American game programmer
- Tim Anderson (chef), British cook
- Tim Anderson (handballer), handballer for Australia men's national handball team
