= Craig Anderson =

Craig Anderson may refer to:

- Craig Anderson (actor) (born 1978), Australian writer and actor
- Craig Anderson (bishop) (1942–2026), American Episcopalian bishop
- Craig Anderson (ice hockey) (born 1981), former NHL goaltender
- Craig Anderson (1960s pitcher) (born 1938), former Major League Baseball pitcher
- Craig Anderson (2010s pitcher) (born 1980), Australian-born minor league baseball pitcher in the Baltimore Orioles organization
- Craig Anderson (motocross), Australian motocross rider
- Craig Anderson, producer/director, first director of the play On Golden Pond
- Craig A. Anderson, American psychology professor at Iowa State University
