= Ryan Anderson =

Ryan Anderson may refer to:

== Sports ==
=== Basketball ===
- Ryan Anderson (basketball, born 1987), American basketball player in Canada, who played in college for Nebraska
- Ryan Anderson (basketball, born 1988), American basketball player in the NBA, who played in college for California
- Ryan Anderson (basketball, born 1992), American basketball player in Germany, played college basketball for Boston College & Arizona

=== Other sports ===
- Ryan Anderson (linebacker) (born 1994), American football linebacker
- Ryan Anderson (punter) (born 1995), American football punter
- Ryan Anderson (baseball) (born 1979), American baseball pitcher
- Ryan Anderson (cyclist) (born 1987), Canadian racing cyclist
- Ryan Anderson (monster truck driver) (born 1989), American monster truck driver
- Ryan Anderson (musher) (born 1981), dog musher and dog sled racer from Minnesota

== Others ==
- Ryan G. Anderson (born 1978), U.S. National Guard specialist convicted of aiding the enemy in 2004
- Ryan T. Anderson (born 1981), American conservative political scientist
