= Ross Anderson =

Ross Anderson may refer to:

- Ross Anderson (skier) (born 1971), American alpine and speed skier
- Ross Anderson (swimmer) (born 1968), New Zealand swimmer
- Ross J. Anderson (1956–2024), British researcher, writer, and industry consultant in security engineering
- G. Ross Anderson (1929–2020), American attorney, politician, and jurist
- Rocky Anderson (Ross Carl Anderson, born 1951), former mayor of Salt Lake City (2000–2008)
