= Sophie Anderson =

Sophie Anderson may refer to:

- Sophie Anderson (actress) (1987–2023), English pornographic actress
- Sophie Anderson (author), British writer
- Sophie Gengembre Anderson (1823–1903), French-born British artist
