= Derek Anderson =

Derek Anderson may refer to:

- Derek Anderson (American football) (born 1983), American football quarterback
- Derek Anderson (basketball) (born 1974), basketball player
- Derek Anderson (footballer) (born 1972), Scottish football (soccer) player
- Derek Anderson (fighter) (born 1990), American mixed martial artist
