= Sonia Anderson =

British archivist (1944–2020)

Sonia Primrose Anderson FRHistS FSA (1944 - 8 September 2020) was an archivist.

== Career ==
Anderson gained a BLitt from the University of Oxford in 1970, where she studied at Somerville College. She initially worked for the Society of Antiquaries of London before moving to the Royal Commission on Historical Manuscripts where she remained for the rest of her working life. Anderson was the assistant editor of the Journal of the Society of Archivists for over sixteen years and had served as its reviews editor for a decade upon her retirement in 1992. She was elected as a fellow of the Society of Antiquaries of London in March 1994, and was also a fellow of the Royal Historical Society.

== Select publications ==
- Anderson, S. 1989. An English Consul in Turkey: Paul Rycaut in Smyrna 1667-1678. Oxford, Clarendon Press.
