= Jesse Anderson (disambiguation) =

Jesse Anderson (1957–1994) was an American convicted murderer later murdered in prison.

Jesse Anderson may also refer to:

- Jesse Anderson (musician) (1940–2014), American blues singer-songwriter and musician
- Jesse Anderson (American football) (born 1966), retired American football player
- Jesse Anderson, fictional character from Yu-Gi-Oh! GX
