= Ben Anderson (entrepreneur) =

American entrepreneur

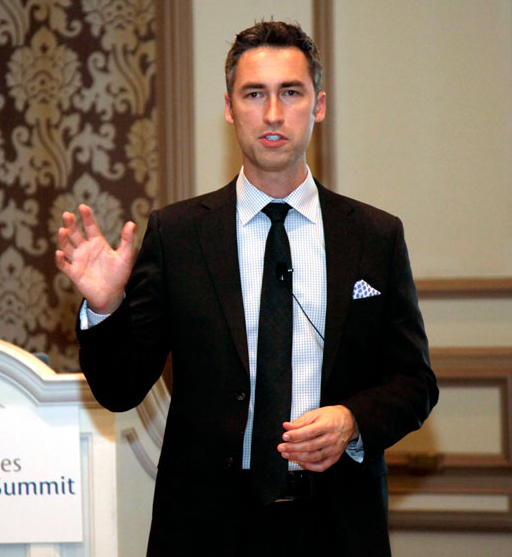
- Anderson speaking in 2015
- Born: June 25, 1981 (age 45); Minneapolis, Minnesota
- Education: University of Saint Thomas (B.S.)
- Occupation: CEO of AutoMotion

Ben Anderson is a Minneapolis-born entrepreneur and the founder of Cinemotion, LLC. Anderson, a graduate of the University of Saint Thomas is currently CEO of AutoMotion.

== Early life and background ==
Ben was home-educated from kindergarten, graduating from the University of Saint Thomas in 2005 with a degree in entrepreneurship.

== Recognition ==
Anderson founded Cinemotion in 2001 while at St. Thomas and received numerous collegiate awards including the 2005 Pentair Student Entrepreneur of the Year honor. Anderson was a featured young entrepreneur by BusinessWeek, Minneapolis/St. Paul Star Tribune, Twin Cities Business Monthly, and TCB among others. Anderson was a finalist to appear on the first season of Shark Tank but declined based on contract terms. In 2011 Anderson was awarded Young Entrepreneur of the Year by the US Small Business Administration. Anderson is a regular speaker for automotive OEMs and events such as J.D. Power.

== Data Privacy ==
An original vocal critic of social media and an advocate of data privacy, Anderson has stated that he has never had any social media accounts, including Facebook and LinkedIn. Anderson's speeches have included the motto, "don't put your data in other's hands" and reference strategies to control personal information on the web.

== Racing career ==
Anderson is a professional auto racing driver. Anderson won the NASA Championships in 2014, 2015, and 2017 also winning in Pirelli GT4 America and other racing series. Anderson was a finalist in the 2014 Mazdaspeed Shootout. In 2017 Anderson formed Ben Anderson Racing Driver Development and formed a new Formula 4 United States Championship team.
