= Brad Anderson =

Brad Anderson may refer to:

== People ==
- Brad Anderson (cartoonist) (1924–2015), American cartoonist, creator of the comic strip Marmaduke
- Brad Anderson (director) (born 1964), American film director
- Brad Anderson (wrestler) (born 1969), American professional wrestler
- Brad Anderson (executive) (born 1949), vice chairman of Best Buy
- Brad Anderson (motocross rider) (born 1981), British motocross rider
- Brad Anderson (American football) (born 1961), American football player
- Brad Anderson (colorist), comics colorist and artist, co-founder of Ghost Machine

== Fictional characters ==
- Brad Anderson, a character in the 1987 film Adventures in Babysitting
