= Andrijašević =

Origin
- Language: Serbo-Croatian
- Meaning: patronymic of Andrija

Andrijašević (Serbo-Croatian pronunciation: [andrijǎːʃeʋitɕ]) is a Serbo-Croatian surname, a patronymic derived from Andrija. Notable people with the name include:

- Dominik Andrijašević (1572–1639), Ragusan Franciscan friar and bishop
- Đorđe Andrijašević (1931–2025), Serbian basketball player and coach
- Franko Andrijašević (born 1991), Croatian footballer
- Martin Andrijasevic (born 1999), Canadian YouTuber
- Stjepan Andrijašević (born 1967), Croatian footballer
- Živko Andrijašević (born 1967), Montenegrin historian
