= Keith Anderson (disambiguation) =

Keith Anderson (born 1968) is an American country musician.

Keith Anderson may also refer to:

- Keith Anderson (actor) (1929–2007), British television actor
- Keith Anderson (saxophonist) (born 1970), American jazz saxophonist
- Keith Anderson or Bob Andy (1944–2020), Jamaican reggae artist
- Keith Anderson (politician) (1916–1965), Australian politician
- Keith Anderson (runner) (born 1957), British runner
- Keith Anderson (Good Times), character in the 1970s sitcom
- Keith Vincent Anderson (1898–1929), Australian pilot
