= Del M. Anderson =

American academic administrator, former college president (born 1937)

Del Marie Anderson

President of San Jose City College
- In office 1991–1995

Chancellor of City College of San Francisco
- In office 1995–1998

Personal details
- Born: Del Marie Neely; November 6, 1937 (age 88) Mississippi, U.S.
- Education: Alcorn A&M College; San Diego State University (BA, MSW)

Del Marie Anderson (née Del Marie Neely; born 1937) is an American academic administrator, former university president, and fashion model. Early in her career, Neely was a fashion model for Ebony magazine. This was followed by an assistant professorship of social work at San Diego State University before she moved into college administration. Anderson served as the president of San Jose City College from 1991 to 1995. She was also the chancellor of the City College of San Francisco from 1995 to 1998. She has also used the name Del Marie Anderson Handy.

== Early life and education ==
Del Marie Anderson was born as Del Marie Neely on November 6, 1937, in Mississippi. She was the daughter of James Neely and Emma Williams, and the step-daughter of Frank Williams. She attended Cherry Street Elementary School, and Bowman High School in Vicksburg, Mississippi.

Neely graduated Alcorn A&M College (now Alcorn State University) in Lorman, Mississippi, where she studied business before moving to California. In 1965, she obtained a Bachelor of Arts degree from San Diego State University. In 1967, she obtained a master of social work degree, also from San Diego State University.

== Career ==
=== Modeling career ===
Neely also attended modeling school in San Francisco, and got a modeling job with Ebony magazine's Fashion Fair. In 1961, she toured the United States with the Ebony fashion fair Internationale. Neely appeared on the front cover of Jet magazine on December 7, 1961.

=== Career in higher education ===
In 1969, Anderson became an assistant professor of social work at San Diego State University. In 1972, she became the dean of counseling services at Grossmont College. In 1981, she became the dean of student services at Los Angeles Harbor College. In 1986, Anderson became the vice-president of instruction at Skyline College. In 1991, Anderson became the first female president of San Jose City College (SJCC) and its 13,000 students, besting 166 other candidates for the top job. She served in that position until 1995. Later, she was the chancellor of the City College of San Francisco (CCSF) from 1995 to 1998.

== Personal life ==
Anderson was married to her first husband (Note: Fred Anderson. He was faculty member at San Diego State and USC, then Dean of Student Affairs in the School of Social Work. They wed sometime before 1972. (Per oral interview with subject.)) for 16 years. Anderson met her second husband, musician John Handy in 1989 and later married. In 2018, the pair served as co-chairs of the SFJazz Gala at SF Jazz in San Francisco.

== Publications ==
- Travis, Georgia and Neely, Del M. "Grappling with the Concept of Self-Determination". Social Casework, vol 48, issue 8 (October 1967).
- Anderson, Del M. 1993. "Non-Traditional Paths to Advancement: The California Community College Experience." In Cracking the Wall: Women in Higher Education, edited by Patricia Turner Mitchell, 45–62. New York: College & University Professional Assn. ISBN ISBN 1-878240-21-8.
- Anderson Handy, Del. 2023. "Jumptime!: Memoir of a Higher Education Disruptor". Academic Enterprises. ISBN 9798989510207.
