= Daniel J. Anderson =

American artist

Daniel J. Anderson (November 2, 1945 – February 5, 2023) was an American ceramic artist, studio potter, and teacher. He was known for his depictions of architectural forms and imagery of the American Midwest, including water towers, silos and oil cans. He also made extensive use of ceramic decals to reference topics ranging from corporate logos and mascots, to baseball, to notable people including ceramic artists.

Anderson studied at the University of Wisconsin - River Falls, graduating with a BS in Art Education in 1968, and then completed his MFA at the Cranbrook Academy of Art in Michigan in 1970. He taught ceramics at Southern Illinois University at Edwardsville, IL, from 1970 to 2002. He remained a professor emeritus at SIU until his death.
