= Bernie Anderson Jr. =

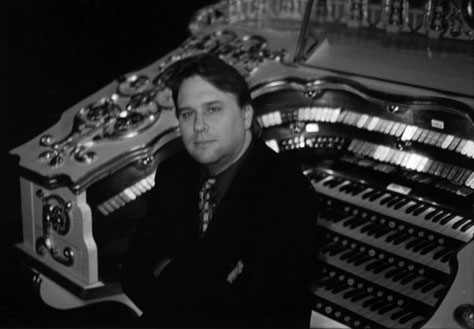

Background information
- Born: New Jersey, U.S.
- Genres: Silent film music, musical theatre
- Occupations: Composer, organist, orchestrator
- Instruments: Organ & Piano
- Award: ASCAP Foundation Frederick Loewe Scholarship (1999)
- Website: www.roxysilentfilms.com

Bernie Anderson Jr. is a silent film music composer, organist and orchestrator. He has presented live accompaniments for silent films, with theatre organ and piano since 1995. He is also active in the preservation and restoration of Movie Palaces, Theatre organs and Classic Film.

== Early musical training ==
A native of New Jersey, Bernie started playing keyboard at the age of five. He earned his Bachelor of Music summa cum laude from Montclair State University in Music Composition and a Master of Fine Arts at New York University, Tisch School of the Arts Graduate Musical Theatre Writing Program. Bernie became interested in silent films after meeting legendary silent movie organist Lee Erwin. Lee became a major influence on Bernie's composition.

== Silent film music composition and performance ==
Bernie began composing and performing his silent film scores for organ and piano in 1995 with a screening of Chaplin's "Gold Rush". From 1990 to 2004, Anderson was house organist for the Union County Arts Center (formerly known as the Rahway Theatre) in Rahway, New Jersey and staff organist at the Lafayette Theatre (Suffern), NY from 1992 to 2005. On April 21, 2002, The New York Times reported that Bernie would accompany the silent film Go West (1925 film) starring Buster Keaton at the restored Lafayette Theater in Suffern, New York, a restored 1921 movie theatre that had installed a restored Wurlitzer pipe organ. A student of legendary silent movie organist Lee Erwin and former Radio City Music Hall house organist Ashley Miller, he has performed extensively in the New York City area in such venues as Radio City Music Hall, the Paramount Theatre (Brooklyn, New York)(now LIU Gym) in Brooklyn, NY, The Donnell Library (New York Public Library) and the Dickinson Theatre Organ Society,. In 2003, he was the organist for the Library of Congress American Movie Classics Film Preservation tour. He made his Capitol Theatre debut at the 2005 Capitolfest film festival and has performed at each of the successive Capitolfests. Bernie has recorded new scores for 4 DVDs over the past 5 years, including American Slapstick, Vol.1 for Image Distribution. Mr. Anderson, recently, played for the grand opening of the Bound Brook Theatre in Bound Brook, New Jersey with the film "the Winning of Barbara Worth". In July 2003, Bernie had the pleasure of being the premiere organist for AGO's Pipe Organ Encounter (POE) which was held at Radio City Music Hall on the Music Hall's 4/58 Wurlitzer. The event's purpose was to expose Classical Organ Students to the world of theatre organ. In Feb 2005, in a concert with Dave Kopp, Bernie played the first public NYTOS concert at Radio City Music Hall since 1979.

== Orchestrations ==
In 2005, he wrote the orchestrations for a new musical, The Girl in the Frame, presented at Goodspeed Opera House in Connecticut, and published by Theatrical Rights Worldwide in 2007. Anderson recently finished orchestrations for another new musical entitled I See London, I See France . . ., which premiered at the New York Musical Theatre Festival in September 2007 In 1997, Anderson wrote the orchestrations for "Triplets: The Diva Musical", starring Ruth Brown and Carol Woods (performer) at Theatrefest in Montclair, NJ. From 1996 to 2000, Bernie worked as an Orchestration Assistant to Doug Bersterman and studied orchestration with of Danny Troob

== Commissions ==
In May 2000, Bernie teamed up with Broadway Composer, William Finn to write 2 new songs based on Ogden Nash poems commissioned by The New Yorker Magazine for their 75 years of New Yorker Humor festival, "I Say It's Spinache!" at the Townhall Theatre in New York City. The show starred Alec Baldwin, Swoosie Kurtz, Buck Henry and Chris Durang with special guest, Broadway performer Debbie Shapiro-Gravitte and William Finn with Piano accompaniment by Bernie Anderson. Directed by Wendy Wasserstein

== Awards ==
- 1999 recipient of The ASCAP Foundation Frederick Loewe Scholarship presented to him by Kitty Carlise.

== Discography ==
- American Slapstick Vol. 1 - "The Bond" with Charlie Chaplin - DVD - IMAGE Distribution (2006)
- The Langdon Collection starring Harry Langdon- DVD - (2005)
- The Great War and the Little Tramp - DVD - (2006)
- Made in New Jersey Double Feature - Beloved Blackmailer & A Girl's Folly - DVD - (2006)
