= Clark L. Anderson =

American academic

Clark Lawrence Anderson is an internist and immunologist. He is professor emeritus in the Division of Immunology and Rheumatology, Department of Internal Medicine, Ohio State University (OSU), Columbus, Ohio, United States.

== Education and personal life ==
Anderson studied medicine and biochemistry at the University of Chicago (MD 1964) after a grounding in the liberal arts at Brown University and the University of Arizona. Upon being drafted as a physician into the Army during the Vietnam War, he served three years in Germany and then continued postgraduate education in internal medicine at the University of Colorado. Subsequent to postdoctoral research in immunochemistry with Richard Farr, Percy Minden, and Howard Grey at the National Jewish Hospital in Denver, CO, he joined the faculty at the University of Rochester in 1977; and in 1986 he moved to OSU as professor in the Departments of Internal Medicine, Molecular and Cellular Biochemistry, and Molecular Genetics. Anderson is married to Carole Ann Anderson, administrator in higher education, former dean of the OSU College of Nursing, the College of Dentistry, and the Graduate School; former president of the American Association of Colleges of Nursing and fellow of the American Academy of Nursing. The couple has three daughters.

== Research areas ==
Anderson's academic career, funded continuously for more than 40 years by R01 grants from the National Institutes of Health, has focused on how Immunoglobulin G (IgG) antibodies mediate their cell biological effects through the family of Fcγ receptors (a class of Fc receptors that are members of the immunoglobulin superfamily). His research contributions to biomedicine and immunology fall into four major groups:

1. The Fcγ Receptor (FcγR) family of molecules. Anderson's early work on identifying and characterizing the high affinity FcγRI and low affinity FcγRII for IgG on human monocytes and other cells was aided by his development of monoclonal antibodies (mab) to both of these receptors, mab 32.2 (US Patent US4954617A awarded in 1990) to the former in collaboration with Michael Fanger and Paul Guyre, and mab IV.3 to the latter in collaboration with R. John Looney. To facilitate the clinical application of these antibodies, Anderson enabled the establishment by Fanger and Guyre of Medarex, Inc., a biotech company since acquired by Bristol-Myers Squibb for 2.4 billion $US. Further studies by Anderson showed FcRI to be associated with the FcRγ chain, and that both receptors upon clustering mediated intracellular kinase cascades that triggered various biological effects. This early work catalyzed an avalanche of studies that have allowed the elaboration of the FcγR family of proteins, now known to consist of several genes (8 in human, 5 in mouse), over 20 transcripts, and at least 9 expressed protein receptors; further, it has become clear that clustering of these receptors results in a variety of biological effects such as superoxide and cytokine output, cell-mediated killing, endocytosis, all resulting in removal of the antigen and perversely in disease-causing auto-immune effects.
2. IgG turnover mediated by the neonatal Fc receptor (FcRn) Anderson, reading the published work of others describing IgG deficiency in the beta2-microglobulin knock out mouse, realized that this strain was likely IgG deficient not because of low IgG production but because of rapid IgG degradation due to an FcRn deficiency. He formally affirmed this explanation by measuring the serum IgG decay rate in this KO strain. Brambell's prediction of the 1960s was thus confirmed, that a single Fc receptor served both to transport IgG across the placenta and to divert IgG from degradation. This high affinity characteristic of IgG for FcRn is exploited by the drug industry to prolong the lifespan of protein drugs.
3. Albumin homeostasis mediated by FcRn. Anderson observed in vitro in detergent solution that albumin co-purified with a soluble variant of FcRn in roughly equimolar proportions, and realized that FcRn likely prolongs the half-life of albumin as it does IgG, thus explaining the lengthy lifespan of albumin in humans and lab animals. He formally affirmed this conclusion analyzing albumin decay in b2m and FcRn KO mouse strains, and then showed that the two ligands bound to FcRn at different sites, independently, that the stoichiometric ratio of the IgG:FcRn:albumin interaction was 2:1:1, that comparison of the published sequences of FcRn in many species suggested that albumin bound to FcRn near the A peptide pocket, that the site on albumin responsible for interaction was the III domain. Co-crystal studies by others have confirmed these conclusions. Kinetic studies indicate that the evolution of FcRn was a great boon to metabolic economy: Were it not for the presence of FcRn the mouse would require a liver twice as large and an immune system five times larger to maintain albumin and IgG concentrations The albumin-FcRn interaction described by Anderson has also been exploited by the pharmaceutical industry to prolong the lifespan of protein drugs.
4. The removal of small particles from blood by liver sinusoidal endothelium (LSEC) Anderson serendipitously observed that an astonishingly high fraction of the body's FcγRIIb was expressed in the sinusoidal endothelium of the liver. This receptor earlier had been studied only as an inhibitory molecule of the immune system. Rigorously exploring this observation, his laboratory found that fully 70% of the total body content of FcγRIIb is expressed in the sinusoidal endothelium; that FcγRIIb is unassociated with the FcRγ chain and thus likely does not convey inhibitory signals; that it mediates the uptake and ultimate degradation of small pinocytosable immune complexes. His lab demonstrated in mice that HIV particles, in the absence of antibody opsonization, are taken up from blood and degraded by the liver sinusoidal endothelium at a rate of 100 million per minute. These cells (LSEC) take up other viruses and other particles in their capacity as the body's garbage dump, clearing small particles from the blood stream.

The distinctive features of Anderson's career have been the linearity of his scientific pursuit; the aggressive borrowing of technical solutions; a pursuit of basic and not translational questions; the publication of only model-changing work; collaborations only with helpers; a focus on hypothesis-denying experiments; an avoidance of review- and chapter-writing; no commercial backing but 40 years of continuous NIH R01 support.

== Honors ==
- Leukemia Society of America Special Fellow 1975-77
- Research Career Development Award, NIAID 1979-84
- Medical Biochemistry Study Section, DRG, NIH 1987-91
- University Distinguished Scholar Award, OSU 1994
