= Adam Anderson, Lord Anderson =

Scottish judge (1797–1853)

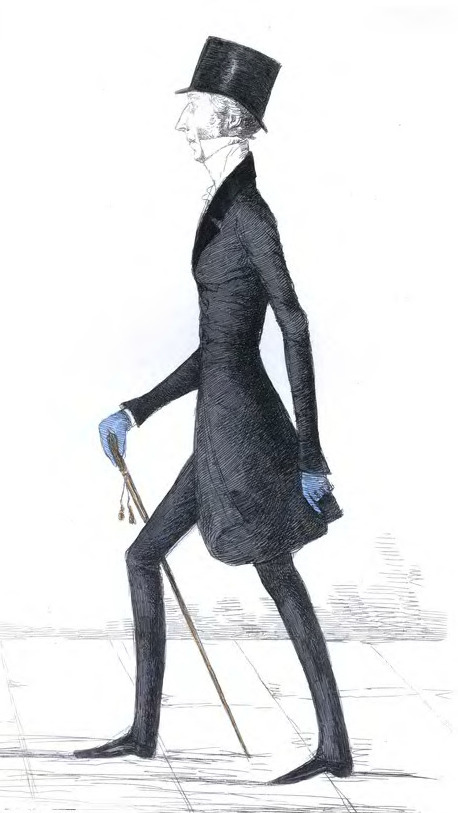
- portrait by Benjamin W. Crombie

Adam Anderson, Lord Anderson FRSE (5 March 1797 – 28 September 1853) was a Scottish judge and Senator of the College of Justice.

== Life ==
Anderson was the second son of Samuel Anderson of Moredun, an Edinburgh banker, and Jane Hay. The family lived at 41 George Street, then a new building in the still-growing New Town.

He qualified as an Advocate in 1818. From 1835 to 1841 he was Sheriff of Perth. He served as Solicitor General for Scotland from 1842 to 1846 and as Lord Advocate from February to May 1852.

In 1850 he was living at 98 George Street in Edinburgh.

Anderson was elected a Fellow of the Royal Society of Edinburgh on 5 February 1849.

He died at Upper Brook Street in London, age 56.

== Character ==
Anderson is described in the journal of James Robertson, sheriff-substitute, in his entry for 22 November 1842 as follows:

Anderson's appointment must give general satisfaction. I remember when I went to Edinburgh first in November 1818 Anderson was newly come out to the bar that same year, and McNeill two years before...Anderson is a son of the late Mr Anderson of Moredun. He is connected with the Forbeses and Hays, and his brother is now one of the Partners of Sir William Forbes & Company's Bank. There is a Colony of the Andersons in and about Edinburgh such as the Andersons of St Germains, Moredun, &c &c - all cousins, and all descended from decent East Lothian farmers as I believe and elevated into gentry some Century back. If I remember right their ancestor acted as Guide to Charles Edward's Army in their attack upon Cope through the Marshes of Preston to which neighbourhood he belonged...He is a thin pale man, six feet five or six inches high, with a delicate complexion, gentlemanlike look, mild, modest and respectable. His gait in walking has a peculiar twist that reminds one of a bent willow, or a serpent or Eel. His voice is weak and squeaking, but Clear, and his mind like his person is respectable. He is a good lawyer, is acute, fluent in speech, but neither eloquent nor forcible - and is apt to be somewhat diffuse and prolix in his pleadings. His fluency too is more acquired than natural. - In the Teind Court the whole Judges sit together, and I remember Adam Anderson, then a boyish looking lad in the summer of 1819 or 1820, rising up in the middle of a very thronged bar and crowded Court, to make a motion. His length appeared awkward and preposterous - he mistook his motion, stammered out something in great trepidation, and when the Lord President Hope with a look of surprise and good humour corrected his mistake poor Adam sat down amidst a general titter from the bench, bar and miscellaneous crowd of agents and clerks behind the bar. Now he sits in a silk gown from within the bar and enjoys a first rate practice, with the general estimation and respect of the profession. When the Conservatives came in [sic] December 1834 Duncan McNeill was appointed Solicitor-General and Anderson succeeded him as Sheriff of Perth. He resigned this office about a twelve month ago amidst the general regret of all classes and parties in the county in favour of Whigham, his senior by two years at the bar. He is a batchelor. So much for Anderson.
