= Col Anderson =

Australian rules footballer

Personal information
- Full name: Colin Anderson
- Born: 31 August 1951 (age 75)
- Original team: Mulwala
- Debut: Round 10, 1972, Melbourne vs. North Melbourne, at Arden Street Oval
- Height: 185 cm (6 ft 1 in)
- Weight: 81 kg (179 lb)

Playing career^{1}
Years	Club	Games (Goals)
1972	Melbourne	2 (0)
- ^{1} Playing statistics correct to the end of 1972.

Colin Anderson (born 31 August 1951) is a former Australian rules footballer who played for the Melbourne Football Club in the Victorian Football League (VFL).

Originally from the Mulwala Football Club which competed in the Murray Football League, Anderson was listed with Melbourne from 1969 to 1972. He made his VFL debut in the round 10 match against North Melbourne at Arden Street Oval where he was named as a ruck rover and was retained in the side the next week in the match against Fitzroy at Junction Oval for his final VFL match, in which he totalled two senior games for his career.

He was transferred to the Glenelg Football Club in the South Australian National Football League (SANFL) in 1973 where he went on to play 90 games and kick 93 goals.

He was also a professional sprinter where he won the 1975 Bendigo Two Thousand race.

Following his career with Glenelg, he became a playing coach at Wagga in the Farrer Football League in 1976 where he led the Wagga Tigers Firsts to 3 consecutive Grand Finals, winning the first two in 1977 and 1978. In 1980, there was speculation he would return to the VFL and sign with South Melbourne, however, he was unable to secure a transfer from Glenelg and returned to that SA club to try and help secure a premiership with the SANFL Tigers in 1980, where he played the entire season helping to get Glenelg into the GF. Coach John Halbert dropped him the morning of the GF into the reserves in favour of an untried shorter player, Tony McInnes, debuting into the 1st’s in the GF. The 1st’s lost and the Glenelg Reserves took the flag. A bitter-sweet end to Anderson’s career with the Bays. pla
