= Jessica Anderson =

Jessica Anderson may refer to:

- Jessica Anderson (writer) (1916–2010), Australian novelist and short story writer
- Jessica Anderson (mayor) (born 1978), American policy analyst and mayor of Chapel Hill, North Carolina
- Jessica Anderson (footballer) (born 1997), Australian rules footballer
- Jessie Valentine (née Anderson; 1915–2006), Scottish amateur golfer
- Jessie Anderson (The Walking Dead), a character on The Walking Dead
- Jessica Anderson (politician), American politician from Virginia

== See also ==
- Jessica Andersen (born 1973), American writer
- Jessica Andersson (born 1973), Swedish singer
