= Art Anderson =

American football player (1936–2021)

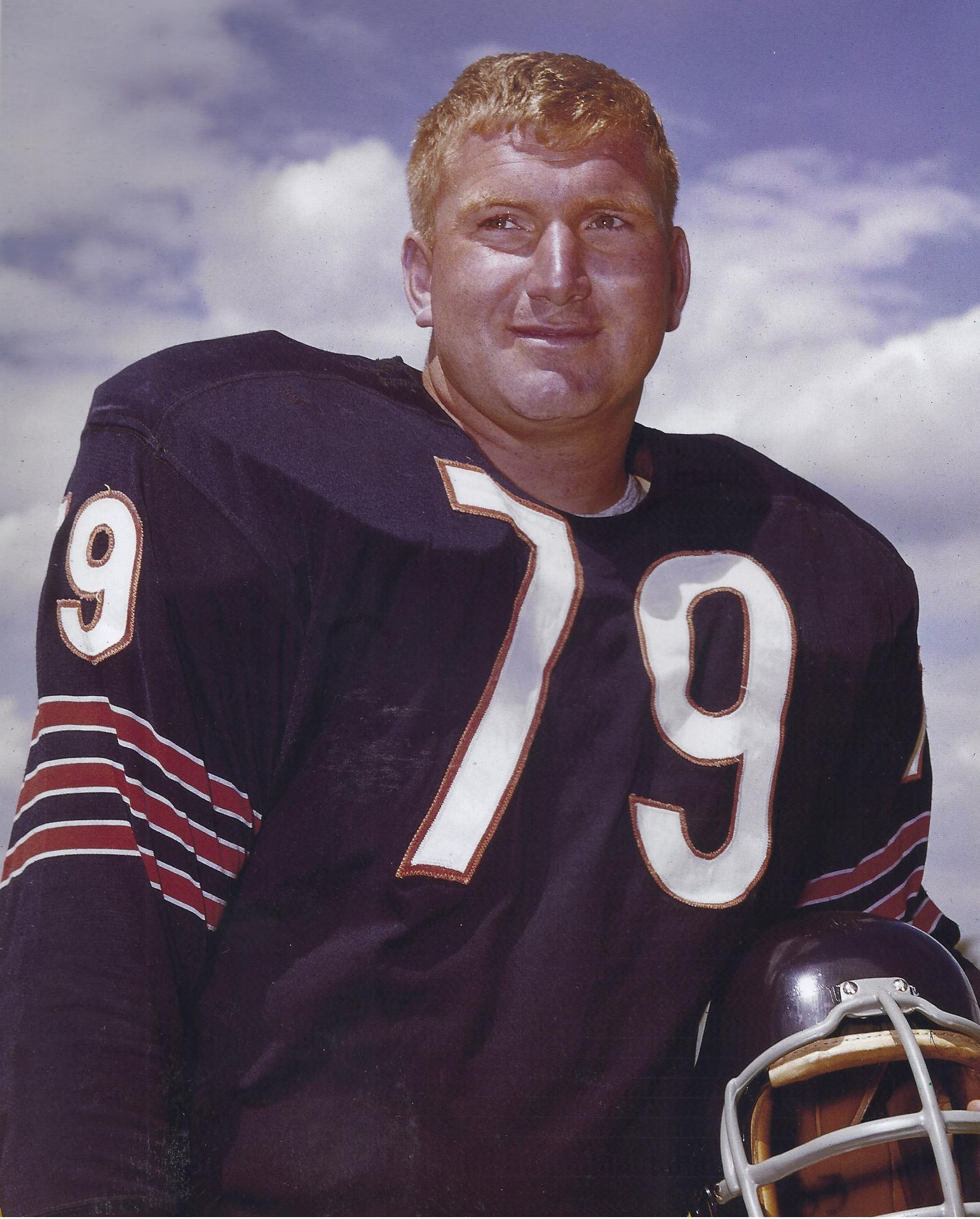
- Anderson in 1962

No. 79, 63
- Position: Offensive tackle

Personal information
- Born: October 9, 1936; Breckenridge, Minnesota, U.S.
- Died: February 25, 2021 (aged 84); San Diego, California, U.S.
- Listed height: 6 ft 3 in (1.91 m)
- Listed weight: 244 lb (111 kg)

Career information
- College: Idaho
- NFL draft: 1961: undrafted

Career history
- Chicago Bears (1961–1962); Pittsburgh Steelers (1963)

Career NFL statistics
- Games played: 41
- Games started: 26
- Fumble recoveries: 2
- Stats at Pro Football Reference

Arthur Anthony Anderson (October 9, 1936 – February 25, 2021) was an American professional football offensive tackle in the National Football League (NFL). He is one of the few tackles to prevent Pro Football Hall of Fame inductee Deacon Jones from accomplishing any sacks in a game (1961 season). His teammates on the Chicago Bears under George Halas included Pro Football Hall of Fame inductees Stan Jones (his close friend), Doug Atkins, and 1961 rookie Mike Ditka.

== Early life ==
Anderson grew up in Wahpeton, North Dakota on the Minnesota state line, in a house his grandfather built. His father was Arthur Albin Anderson, the first North Dakota Highway Patrolman stationed in Wahpeton (6th in North Dakota), appointed in 1936. Because of the similarity of their names, the family called him Tony. He went to a Catholic grade school, and lettered in all three sports at Wahpeton High School where his basketball team won the State Class A Championship in 1954.

== Football career ==
Anderson wanted to attend University of Notre Dame, but the University of Idaho offered scholarships, so he went to Moscow for tryouts. He started as a freshman and was a member of Skip Stahley's Idaho Vandals all four years in the PAC-9 conference. In Idaho, Anderson took the field with other future NFL players, including Jerry Kramer and Wayne Walker. In 1957–58 Kramer and Walker made the second all-PCC team; Anderson and teammates Ken Hall and Larry Aldrich received honorable mention on the all-PCC team. Upon graduation in 1958, he had the choice to enlist in the military or be drafted, so he enlisted in the U.S. Marine Corps and was stationed in San Diego. He was spotted in boot-camp and was able to play football for the duration of his military service. Anderson played for three years with the USMC, and was named to the All-Marine Football Team and All-Sea Service Team in 1959 and 1960. Upon discharge, he was recruited to play for the Chicago Bears. His signing bonus was $750. After two seasons playing for George Halas with the Bears (1961 and 1962), Anderson was traded to the Pittsburgh Steelers where he played for one more season (1963).

== Personal life and other accomplishments ==
Following his tour in the Marine Corps and into the early 1990s, Anderson was featured in two San Diego Hall of Champions Museum exhibits: for a dead-lifting weight record (>500 lb); and as a member of the 1959 undefeated champion Marine Corps Recruit Depot San Diego USMC Devildogs football team. Anderson married Sharon Hicks in 1961, a San Diego State University majorette, and their son was born in 1963. After Anderson retired from the NFL, he returned to San Diego where he and his wife had three more children.

Anderson became a teacher in San Diego and was chosen to be swim coach at Clairemont High School in 1965. He received his master's degree in Physical Education from Azusa Pacific University. Anderson directed the Clairemont High School track team to 2 Western League titles, and his 1970-71 cross country team won the CIF-SDS championship. He served 8 years as football coach at Clairemont, leading the Chieftains to CIF-SDS playoffs 3 times and the 1975 Western League title. Anderson went on to lead the track and cross country teams at Hoover and Crawford high schools to multiple league titles, lead a long-dormant San Diego High School football team to a winning season. He was honored 9 times as coach of the year in 3 different sports. Anderson retired after 38 football seasons with city schools. He was named to the San Diego Hall of Champions Brietbard Hall of Fame High School Coaching Legends Roster in 2006, was inducted as a charter member of the North Dakota Richland County Historical Society Sports Hall of Fame in 2011, and was inducted into Wahpeton Public Schools Alumni Foundation Hall of Fame in 2019. Anderson died peacefully in 2021, at the age of 84 under hospice care. He is survived by his wife, four children, eight grandchildren, and two great-grandchildren.
