= Art Anderson (basketball) =

American basketball player (1916–1983)

Personal information
- Born: July 1, 1916 Chicago, Illinois
- Died: April 4, 1983 (aged 66) Cleveland, Ohio
- Listed height: 6 ft 6 in (1.98 m)
- Listed weight: 190 lb (86 kg)

Career information
- College: Augustana (Illinois) (1935–1939)
- Position: Center

Career history
- 1939–1940: Chicago LaSalle Hotel
- 1939–1941: Akron Goodyear Wingfoots

Arthur Torrell Anderson (July 1, 1916 – April 4, 1983) was an American professional basketball player. He played for the Akron Goodyear Wingfoots in the National Basketball League and averaged 0.7 points per game. In 1979, he was elected to the Athletic Hall of Honor at Augustana College, where he was captain of the basketball team.

== Biography ==
Anderson served in the United States army from November 16, 1942, to September 17, 1943, where he played on the Fort Sheridan, Illinois basketball team. After playing professional basketball, he joined the accounting department of Republic Steel in Chicago, Illinois.
