= Anderson House =

Anderson House may refer to:

== Canada ==
- Anderson House (St. John's), in Newfoundland

== United States ==
=== Alaska ===
- Oscar Anderson House Museum, Anchorage, AK, in Alaska

=== Arizona ===
- Max J. Anderson House, Kingman
- R. L. Anderson House, Kingman
- Anderson-Johannes House, Phoenix, listed on the NRHP in Maricopa County
- Helen Anderson House, Phoenix

=== Arkansas ===
- George Anderson House, Big Springs
- Anderson-Hobson Mercantile Store, Foreman
- H.M. Anderson House, Little Rock
- Dr. A. G. Anderson House, Eudora

=== Colorado ===
- Peter Anderson House, Fort Collins

=== Connecticut ===
- Leroy Anderson House, Woodbury

=== Delaware ===
- Anderson House (Newark, Delaware)

=== Florida ===
- Charles B. Anderson House, Elfers or Holiday
- Anderson-Frank House, Tampa

=== Georgia ===
- Anderson House (Danburg, Georgia)
- Capt. R. J. Anderson House, Macon, listed on the NRHP in Bibb County
- Judge Clifford Anderson House, Macon, listed on the NRHP in Bibb County
- Whitman-Anderson House, Ringgold, listed on the NRHP in Catoosa County

=== Idaho ===
- Anderson-Elwell House, Weiser

=== Illinois ===
- John C. Anderson House, Carlinville
- Tiger-Anderson House, Springfield

=== Indiana ===
- Anderson-Thompson House, Indianapolis

=== Iowa ===
- D.H. Anderson House, Maquoketa

=== Kentucky ===
- Anderson House (Haskingsville, Kentucky)
- Anderson-Smith House, Paducah
- Bourne-Anderson House, Taylorsville, listed on the NRHP in Spencer County

=== Massachusetts ===
- Ludwig Anderson Three-Decker, Worcester

=== Michigan ===
- William Anderson House, Ann Arbor

=== Minnesota ===
- Andrew G. Anderson House, Hibbing,,. Louis County
- Gustaf Anderson House, Lindstrom, listed on the NRHP in Chisago County
- J.A. Anderson House, Lamberton, listed on the NRHP in Redwood County
- J. S. Anderson House, Minneota, listed on the NRHP in Lyon County
- Alexander P. Anderson Estate-Tower View, Red Wing, listed on the NRHP in Goodhue County

=== Missouri ===
- Charles Isaac and Lizzie Hunter Moore Anderson House, Commerce
- Battle of Lexington State Historic Site, Lexington
- Elijah Teague Anderson House, Republic

=== Mississippi ===
- Stewart-Anderson House, Tupelo
- Col. Chap Anderson House, Kosciusko, listed on the NRHP in Attala County
- Dewitt Anderson House, West Point, listed on the NRHP in Clay County

=== Montana ===
- Herman and Hannah Anderson House, Forsyth
- Anderson House (Lewistown, Montana)

=== New Jersey ===
- Anderson-Capner House, Lawrence

=== Ohio ===
- Judge William Shaw Anderson House, Austintown
- William Marshall Anderson House, Circleville
- Anderson-Shaffer House, Hamilton
- Felkner-Anderson House, Ostrander, listed on the NRHP in Delaware County
- Levi Anderson House, Chillicothe

=== Oregon ===
- Emanuel and Christina Anderson House, Gresham
- James Mechlin Anderson House, Jefferson, listed on the NRHP in Marion County
- Lewis Anderson House, Barn and Granary, The Dalles
- Thomas N. Anderson House, Gold Hill, listed on the NRHP in Jackson County

=== Pennsylvania ===
- Marian Anderson House, Philadelphia

=== South Carolina ===
- Kincaid-Anderson House, Jenkinsville
- Anderson House (Rock Hill, South Carolina)

=== South Dakota ===
- Dr. Andrew Anderson House, Canton, listed on the NRHP in Lincoln County
- Anderson Homestead, Hub City
- John F. Anderson House, Mitchell, listed on the NRHP in Davison County

=== Tennessee ===
- James E. Collins House, Franklin, also known as Anderson House, formerly
- Anderson-Coward House, Memphis

=== Texas ===
- Anderson House and Store, Salado, listed on the NRHP in Bell County
- Williams-Anderson House, Tyler, listed on the NRHP in Smith County
- John W. Anderson House, Houston

=== Utah ===
- Martin Anderson House, Brigham City
- Niels Ole Anderson House, Ephraim
- James Anderson House (Fairview, Utah)
- Anderson-Clark Farmstead, Grantsville
- Lewis and Clara Anderson House, Manti
- Alfred C. and Annie L. Olsen Anderson House, Sandy
- Charles M. and Fannie M. Allsop Anderson House, Sandy, listed on the NRHP in Salt Lake County
- Frederick C. and Anna Anderson House, Sandy, listed on the NRHP in Salt Lake County
- John A. Anderson House, Sandy, listed on the NRHP in Salt Lake County
- Y. Martin and Hannah Nelson Anderson House, Sandy, listed on the NRHP in Salt Lake County

=== Virginia ===
- Anderson House (Haymakertown, Virginia)
- Anderson-Foster House, Holly Grove

=== Washington D.C. ===
- Larz Anderson House, Washington DC, American headquarters of the Society of the Cincinnati and

=== Wisconsin ===
- Brady Anderson and Waldemar Ager House, Eau Claire
- Mons Anderson House, La Crosse

== See also ==
- Anderson Manor (disambiguation)
- Anderson Barn (disambiguation)
- Anderson Farm (disambiguation)
- Anderson Hall (disambiguation)
- Anderson Historic District (disambiguation)
