= Anderson =

Anderson may refer to:

== Companies ==
- Anderson Electric, an early 20th-century electric car
- Anderson Greenwood, an industrial manufacturer
- Anderson Racing Karts, a manufacturer of Superkart racing chassis
- O.P. Anderson, a brand of aquavit vodka

== People and fictional characters ==
- Anderson (surname), including a list of people and fictional characters
- Anderson (given name)
- Clan Anderson, a Scottish clan
- Anderson (footballer, born 1972)
- Anderson (footballer, born 1978)
- Anderson (footballer, born 1980)
- Anderson (footballer, born 1981) (Andrade Santos Silva), defender
- Anderson (footballer, born 1982)
- Anderson (footballer, born March 1983)
- Anderson (footballer, born April 1983)
- Anderson (footballer, born November 1983)
- Anderson (footballer, born 1985)
- Anderson (footballer, born 1988) (Anderson Luís de Abreu Oliveira), midfielder
- Anderson (footballer, born 1995) (Anderson de Jesus Santos), defender
- Anderson (footballer, born 1997)
- Anderson (footballer, born March 1998) (Anderson Silva da Paixão), goalkeeper
- Anderson (footballer, born October 1998) (Anderson Cordeiro Costa), winger

== Places ==
=== Antarctica ===
- Anderson Dome, a prominent ice-covered mountain in Ellsworth Land

=== Australia ===
- Anderson, Victoria
- Anderson Inlet, Victoria
- Anderson Island (Tasmania)

=== Canada ===
- Anderson, Perth County, Ontario
- Anderson Bay, British Columbia
- Anderson Lake (British Columbia)
- Anderson River (British Columbia)
- Anderson Settlement, New Brunswick
- Anderson River (Northwest Territories)

=== United Kingdom ===
- Anderson, Dorset, a village and civil parish

=== United States ===
- Anderson, Etowah County, Alabama, an unincorporated community
- Anderson, Alabama, a town
- Anderson, Alaska, a city
- Anderson, Arkansas, an unincorporated community
- Anderson, California, a city
- Anderson, Macoupin County, Illinois, an unincorporated community
- Anderson, Indiana, a city
- Anderson, Iowa, an unincorporated community
- Anderson, Michigan, an unincorporated community
- Anderson, Missouri, a city
- Anderson, New Jersey, a census-designated place
- Anderson, Ohio, an unincorporated community
- Anderson, South Carolina, a city
- Anderson, South Dakota, an unincorporated community
- Anderson, Texas, a city
- Anderson, Burnett County, Wisconsin, a town
- Anderson, Iron County, Wisconsin, a town
- Anderson, Rock County, Wisconsin, an unincorporated community
- Anderson Mesa, Arizona, south of Flagstaff
- Anderson River (Indiana)
- Anderson Valley, Mendocino County, California

=== Space ===
- Anderson (crater), a lunar crater

=== Other places ===
- Anderson Barn (disambiguation)
- Anderson Bridge (disambiguation)
- Anderson County (disambiguation)
- Anderson Farm (disambiguation)
- Anderson House (disambiguation)
- Anderson Island (disambiguation)
- Anderson Lake (disambiguation)
- Anderson Manor (disambiguation)
- Anderson Manor (disambiguation)
- Anderson Peak (disambiguation)
- Anderson Road (disambiguation)
- Anderson Township (disambiguation)
- Fort Anderson (disambiguation)

== Schools ==
- Anderson University (Indiana), Anderson, Indiana
- Anderson University (South Carolina), Anderson, South Carolina
- UCLA Anderson School of Management, Los Angeles, California
- Anderson High School (disambiguation)
- The Anderson School PS 334, New York, New York

== Titles ==
- Lord Anderson (disambiguation), peerages created in the UK
- Anderson baronets, nine baronetcies, all extinct

== Transport ==
=== Railroad stations ===
- Anderson Avenue station, in Drexel Hill, Pennsylvania, US
- Anderson railway station (Victoria), a former railway station in Anderson, Victoria, Australia
- Anderson Regional Transportation Center, in Woburn, Massachusetts, US
- Anderson station (Calgary), a light rail station in Calgary, Alberta, Canada
- Anderson Street station, in Hackensack, New Jersey, US
- Anderson station (Indiana), in Anderson, Indiana

=== Other uses in transport ===
- Anderson (automobile), an American car
- Anderson Field (Washington), a public airport in Brewster, Washington, US
- Anderson Field (Nevada), a former airport in Las Vegas, Nevada, US
- Anderson Municipal Airport, a public airport in Anderson, Indiana, US
- Anderson Regional Airport, a public airport in Anderson, South Carolina, US

== Other uses ==
- USS Anderson, a US Navy destroyer
- Anderson (mango), a type of mango originating in Miami, Florida
- Anderson Arena, a sports arena on the campus of Bowling Green State University, Ohio
- Anderson Live, formerly Anderson, an American syndicated talk show
- Anderson Powerpole, a low voltage, high current DC power connector

== See also ==
- Anderson shelter, an air raid shelter used in Britain during the Second World War
- Anderson turn, a ship or boat maneuver
- Andersons (disambiguation)
- Andersen (disambiguation)
- Andersson, a surname
- Andersson (crater), a lunar crater
- Anderssen
