= Anderson Barn =

Anderson Barn, Anderson Farm or Anderson Farmstead may refer to:

== In the United States ==
- Clarence Anderson Barn, Newnata, Arkansas, listed on the NRHP in Arkansas
- Anderson Barn (Johnstown, Colorado)
- Hood-Anderson Farm, Eagle Rock, North Carolina, NRHP-listed
- Lewis Anderson House, Barn and Granary, The Dalles, Oregon, NRHP-listed
- Anderson Barn (Hitchcock, South Dakota)
- Anderson-Clark Farmstead, Grantsville, Utah, listed on the NRHP in Utah
- Anderson-Beletski Prune Farm, Vancouver, Washington, listed on the NRHP in Washington
- D. I. B. Anderson Farm, Morgantown, West Virginia, listed on the NRHP in West Virginia
- Rascoe-Harris Farm, also known as "Anderson Farm", Gallatin, Tennessee

== See also ==
- Anderson Manor (disambiguation)
- Anderson Hall (disambiguation)
- Anderson House (disambiguation)
- Anderson Historic District (disambiguation)
