= Anderssen =

Anderssen is a surname, and may refer to:

- Adolf Anderssen (1818–79), German chess grandmaster, unofficial first world champion from 1851 to 1858, 1860–1865 and 1867–68
  - Anderssen's Opening, chess opening named after Adolf Anderssen
- Justus Anderssen (1867–1938), Norwegian physician and philatelist
- Lena Anderssen (born 1974), Faroese-Canadian singer-songwriter
- Sigmund Alfred Anderssen (born 1961), Norwegian professor
- Torgeir Anderssen-Rysst (1888–1958), Norwegian politician and Minister of Defense

== See also ==
- Andersen
- Anderson (disambiguation)
