= Anderson Site =

Anderson Site may refer to:

- Anderson Site (Stanton, Kentucky), listed on the National Register of Historic Places in Powell County, Kentucky
- Anderson Site (Franklin, Tennessee)

== See also ==
- Anderson House (disambiguation)
