= Mount Anderson =

Mount Anderson may refer to:

- Mount Anderson (Antarctica) in Antarctica
- Mount Anderson (Australia) in the Australian Alps
- Mount Anderson (Washington) in Washington

== See also ==
- Anderson Mountain in Iron County, Missouri
- Anderson Peak (disambiguation)
