= Max Anderson =

Max Anderson may refer to:

- Max Anderson (American football) (born 1945), American football running back and kick returner
- Max Anderson (baseball) (born 2002), American baseball player
- Max Anderson (director) (1914–1959), British director of documentaries
- Max Anderson (footballer) (born 2001), Scottish footballer
- Maxie Anderson (1934–1983), American hot air balloonist and businessman
- Maxwell L. Anderson (born 1956), American art museum director

== See also ==
- Max J. Anderson House, Kingman, Arizona
- Max Andersson (disambiguation)
