= Andersons =

Andersons may refer to:

== People ==
- Alfrēds Andersons (1879–1937), Latvian translator and politician
- Andrew Andersons (born 1942), Australian architect
- Eduards Andersons (1914–1985), Latvian basketball player
- Jānis Andersons (born 1986), Latvian ice hockey player

== Other uses ==
- Anderson baronets, nine baronetcies, all extinct
- Clan Anderson, a Scottish clan
- The Andersons, an American agriculture company
- Andersons (soccer), an American soccer club active in the 1930s

== See also ==
- Anderson (disambiguation)
