= Anderson Peak =

Anderson Peak may refer to:

- Anderson Peak (Alberta) in Alberta, Canada
- Anderson Peak (Judith Basin County, Montana) in Judith Basin County, Montana
- Anderson Peak (Lake County, Montana) in Lake County, Montana
- Anderson Peak (Placer County, California)
- Anderson Peak (San Bernardino Mountains) in California

== See also ==
- Anderson Mountain
- Anderson Paak (born 1986), American singer, rapper, songwriter, record producer and multi-instrumentalist
- Mount Anderson (disambiguation)
