= Max Andersson =

Max Andersson may refer to:

- Max Andersson (cartoonist) (born 1962), Swedish cartoonist
- Max Andersson (politician) (born 1973), Swedish politician

== See also ==
- Max Anderson (disambiguation)
