= Anderson–Elwell House =

Historic house in Idaho, United States

- U.S. National Register of Historic Places
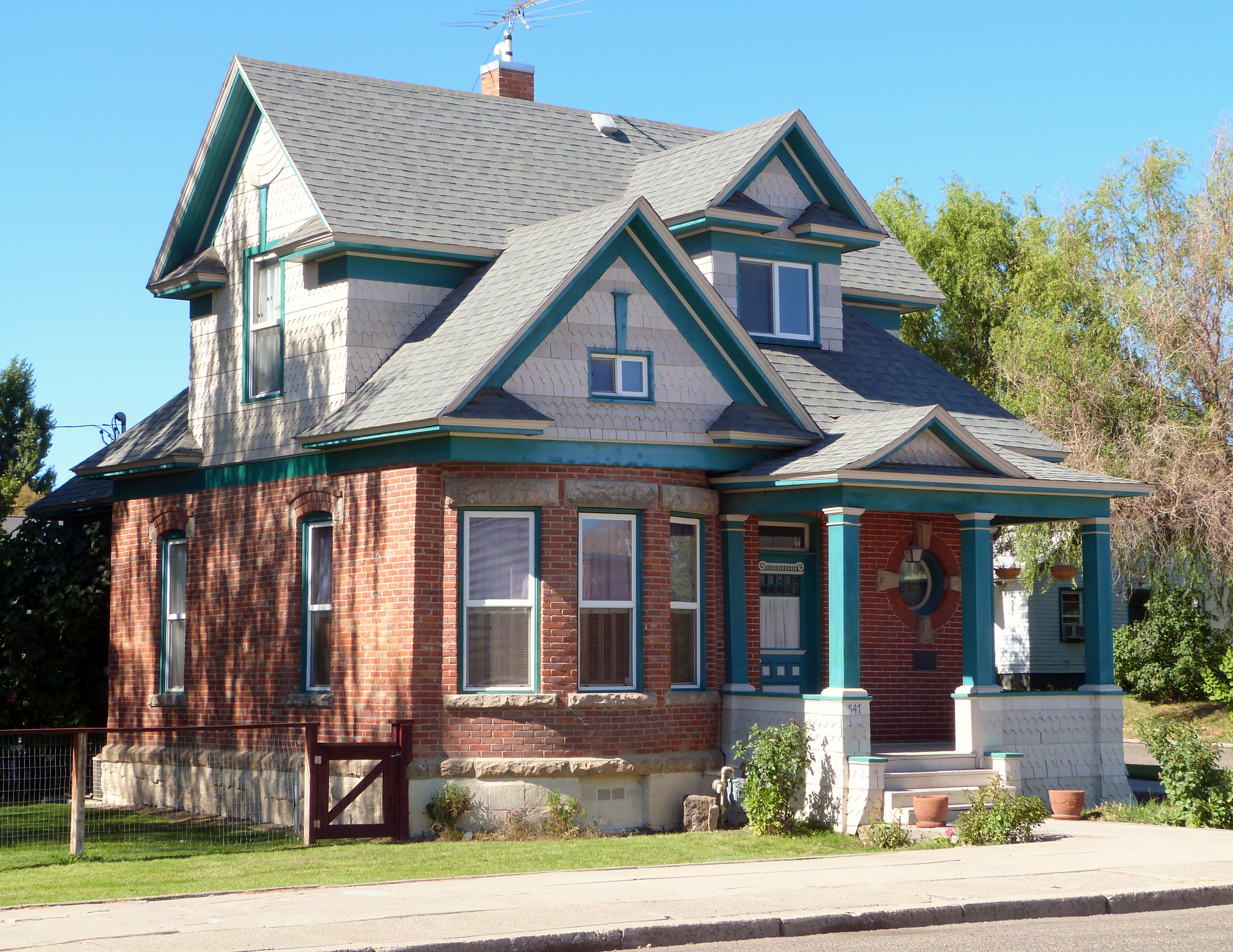

- Location within Idaho Location within the United States
- Location: 547 W. 1st St., Weiser, Idaho
- Coordinates: 44°14′51″N 116°58′12″W
- Area: less than one acre
- Built: 1900
- Architect: John E. Tourtellotte & Company
- Architectural style: Queen Anne
- MPS: Tourtellotte and Hummel Architecture TR
- NRHP reference No.: 82000373
- Added to NRHP: November 17, 1982

The Anderson–Elwell House, located at 547 W. 1st St. in Weiser, Idaho, is a Queen Anne-style cottage which was designed by John E. Tourtellotte & Company and was built in 1900. It was listed on the National Register of Historic Places in 1982.

It is a one-and-one-half-story brick and frame house which is "complex and various in appearance." It includes red brick, cut stone, and shingle siding in several patterns.

The house was built for A. B. Anderson, "a very prominent Weiser capitalist, president of the Weiser Bank, and the town's first mayor (1900-1901)", who lived next door. This house was occupied by Anderson's daughter and her husband Billy Elwell, who was the Weiser manager for Mountain States Telephone Company.
