= Anderson Road =

Anderson Road may refer to:

- Anderson Road, Hong Kong
- Anderson Road (Calgary)
- Anderson Road, New Brunswick, Canada, a settlement located along Route 380
