= Anderson Electric =

The Anderson Electric was a French electric car manufactured only in 1912. The car featured five speeds along with Edison batteries. The 3/9 hp model cost Fr 13,500, while the 4/12 hp model cost Fr 18,500. It was shown at the 1912 Paris Salon.

A 1914 advertisement for the Anderson Electric Car Company claimed that Henry Ford and Thomas Edison had bought three "Detroit Electrics."

== See also ==
- Robert Anderson
