= Anderson High School =

Anderson High School can refer to any of the following.

== Malaysia ==
- Anderson National Secondary School, Ipoh, Perak

== In the United Kingdom ==
- Anderson High School, Lerwick

== In the United States ==
- Anderson Union High School, Anderson, California
- Boyd H. Anderson High School, Lauderdale Lakes, Florida
- Douglas Anderson School of the Arts, Jacksonville, Florida
- Anderson High School (Indiana), Anderson, Indiana
- Anderson County High School (Kansas), Garnett, Kansas
- Anderson County High School (Kentucky), Lawrenceburg, Kentucky
- Southgate Anderson High School, Southgate, Michigan
- Anderson High School (Ohio), Cincinnati, Ohio
- David Anderson High School, Lisbon, Ohio
- Anderson County High School (Tennessee), Clinton, Tennessee
- Anderson High School (Texas), Austin, Texas
