= Andrew G. Anderson House =

Historic house in Hibbing, Minnesota

- U.S. National Register of Historic Places
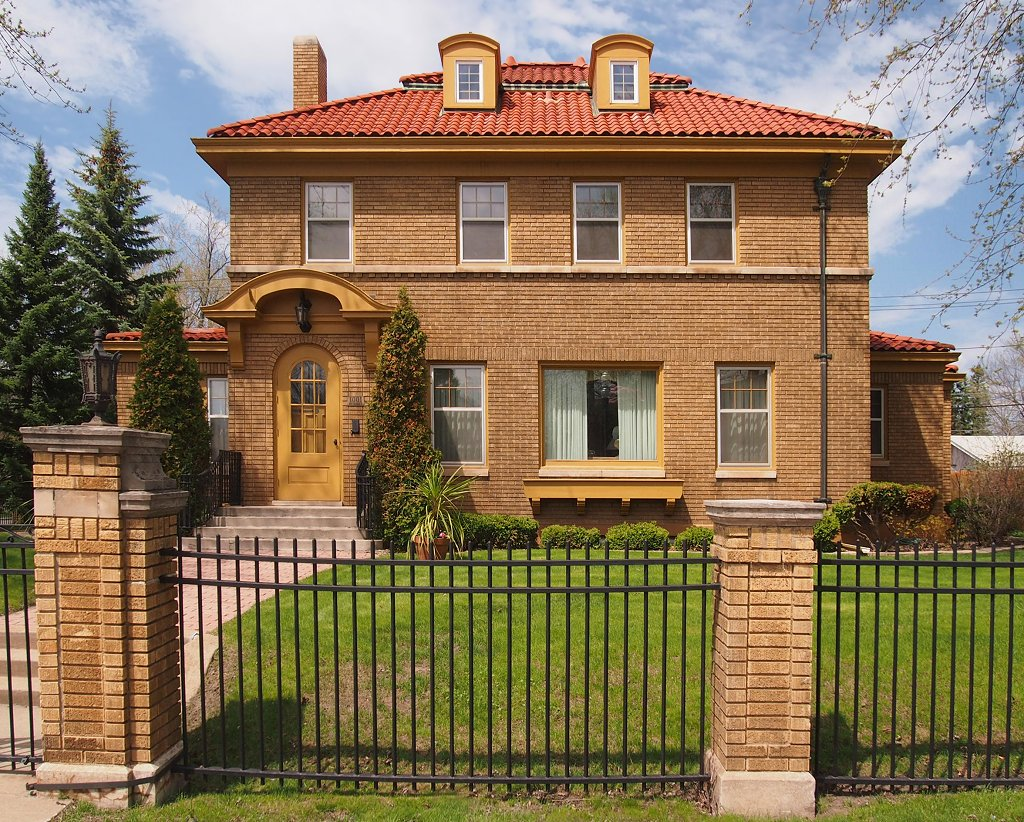
- The Andrew G. Anderson House viewed from the south

- Location within Minnesota Location within the United States
- Interactive map showing the location of Andrew G. Anderson House
- Location: 1001 E. Howard Street, Hibbing, Minnesota
- Coordinates: 47°25′40.3″N 92°55′46″W
- Area: Less than one acre
- Built: 1920
- Architect: J.C. Taylor
- Architectural style: Colonial Revival/Spanish Colonial Revival
- NRHP reference No.: 80004348
- Added to NRHP: December 4, 1980

The Andrew G. Anderson House is a historic house in Hibbing, Minnesota, United States. It was built in 1920 for Andrew "Bus Andy" Anderson, a pioneer in the intercity bus service industry. The house was listed on the National Register of Historic Places in 1980 for its local significance in the themes of architecture and transportation. It was nominated for its association with Anderson and its status as one of the most lavish residences in the Hibbing area.

== Description ==
The Andrew G. Anderson House is a two-story building of cream-colored brick. It stands on a substantial, well-landscaped lot on East Howard Street, Hibbing's central business thoroughfare. The house displays an eclectic mix of Colonial Revival and Spanish Colonial Revival architecture, as does its detached garage. The house has a hip roof clad in Spanish tile, with two small dormers and copper downspouts. The main entrance is on the left end of the south façade. A one-story sun porch projects from the west façade. The property is bordered by a wrought iron fence supported by brick piers.

== History ==
Andrew Anderson and two partners launched a regular bus service between Hibbing and nearby Alice, Minnesota, in the 1910s. Their success was by no means assured, as rail transport was far more familiar and enjoyed a greater reputation for comfort and safety. With a booming local economy underpinned by iron mining, however, Anderson and a growing number of partners prospered, adding routes and vehicles to link the Iron Range communities into one of the nation's first intercity bus networks. Though Anderson's financial interests remained local, the business he helped launch grew into Greyhound Lines.

== See also ==
- National Register of Historic Places listings in St. Louis County, Minnesota
