= Sigmund Alfred Anderssen =

Norwegian academic

Sigmund A. Anderssen (born 26 September 1961) is a professor in physical activity and health in the Department of Sports Medicine at the Norwegian School of Sport Sciences. He also holds a position as adjunct professor at Sogn og Fjordane University College, Faculty of Teacher Education and Sport. He is chair of the National Council on Physical Activity, and a past member of the Medical Council of the Norwegian Diabetes Federation. His main research area is physical fitness and physical activity surveillance, and physical activity in relation to risk factors for diabetes and cardiovascular disease. He has been one of the main authors of the Norwegian and the Nordic physical activity recommendations. He has published more than 100 original research articles, review papers and book chapters, in addition to two books. He was awarded The Norwegian Medical Association's prize in Preventive Medicine in 2001 and the Messner Prize in 2008 for excellence in research and ethics in sports medicine.

== Education ==
1990 Master's degree thesis in work physiology, Norwegian School of Sport Sciences (NSSS)

1996 Ph.D., NSSS

== Professional experience ==
- 1995–96 Associate professor, NCSS
- 1997–2001 Scientific officer at Ullevål University Hospital and associate professor at NSSS
- 2001–2006 Associate professor in physical activity and health at NSSS
- 2006–current Professor, Department of Sports Medicine, at NSSS
- 2010–current Adjunct professor, Sogn og Fjordane University College
