= Anderson County =

Anderson County is the name of five counties in the US:

- Anderson County, Kansas
- Anderson County, Kentucky
- Anderson County, South Carolina
- Anderson County, Tennessee
- Anderson County, Texas
