= Martin Anderson House =

Historic house in Utah, United States

- U.S. National Register of Historic Places
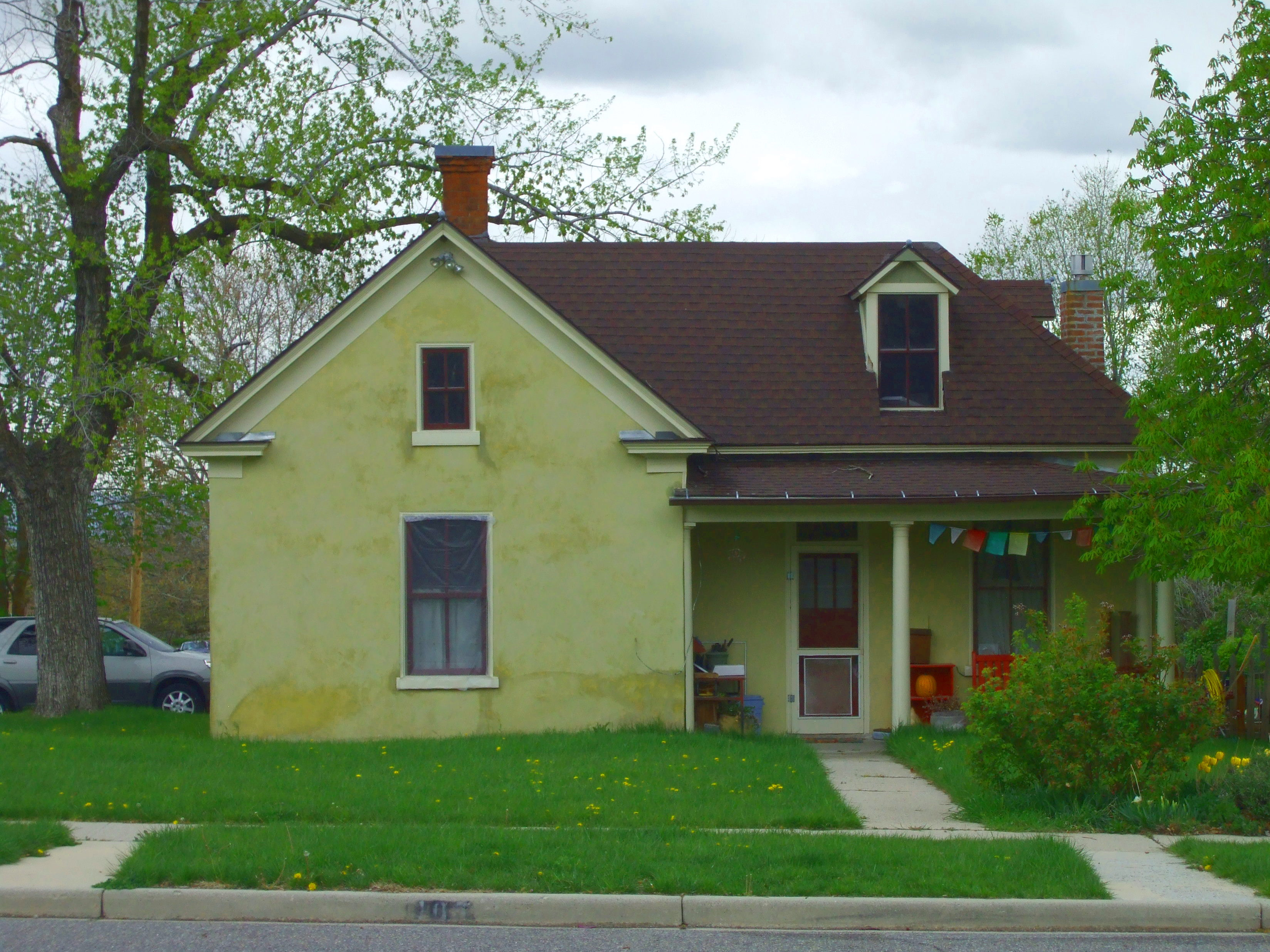

- Location within Utah Location within the United States
- Location: 105 North 300 West, Brigham City, Utah
- Coordinates: 41°30′48″N 112°1′12″W
- Area: 0.3 acres (0.12 ha)
- Built: c. 1886
- Built by: Martin Anderson
- Architectural style: Greek Revival, Late Victorian
- MPS: Brigham City MPS
- NRHP reference No.: 02001735
- Added to NRHP: January 23, 2003

The Martin Anderson House is a historic adobe brick house located at 105 North 300 West in Brigham City, Utah. It was listed on the National Register of Historic Places on January 23, 2003.

== Description and history ==
It is a 1 1/2-story cross-wing house built around 1886 and was expanded to its current size in 1901, making it one of few pioneer-era houses in its area that has not been "remodeled unsympathetically". It includes Greek Revival and Late Victorian architectural elements. It was deemed historically important "for its association with the pioneering phase of the [Brigham City] community and the fruit industry" and is one of eight or fewer classical-style houses in Brigham surviving from the pioneering/settlement period.
