= Anderson Barn (Hitchcock, South Dakota) =

- U.S. National Register of Historic Places
- Location within South Dakota Location within the United States
- Location: 19411 394th St., Hitchcock, South Dakota
- Coordinates: 44°34′29″N 98°20′35″W
- Built: 1885
- Built by: Anderson, Bengt
- NRHP reference No.: 03000763
- Added to NRHP: August 15, 2003

Anderson Barn, near Hitchcock in Beadle County, South Dakota, is a barn built in 1885 by Bengt Anderson. It was listed on the National Register of Historic Places in 2003.

It was built to house livestock and horses. It is notable as an example of a feeder barn.

It has a gable roof with asphalt shingles as of 2003, over sides covered mostly by tongue and groove wood siding, on a poured concrete foundation. Its north side has 8-by-10-foot (2.4 by 3.0 m) doors on tracks. In 2003 its interior featured a 30-foot (9.1 m) manger, and was mostly unchanged except it had a poured concrete floor. Its loft can store 40 short tons (36,000 kg) of hay.
