= John C. Anderson House =

Historic house in Illinois, United States

- U.S. National Register of Historic Places
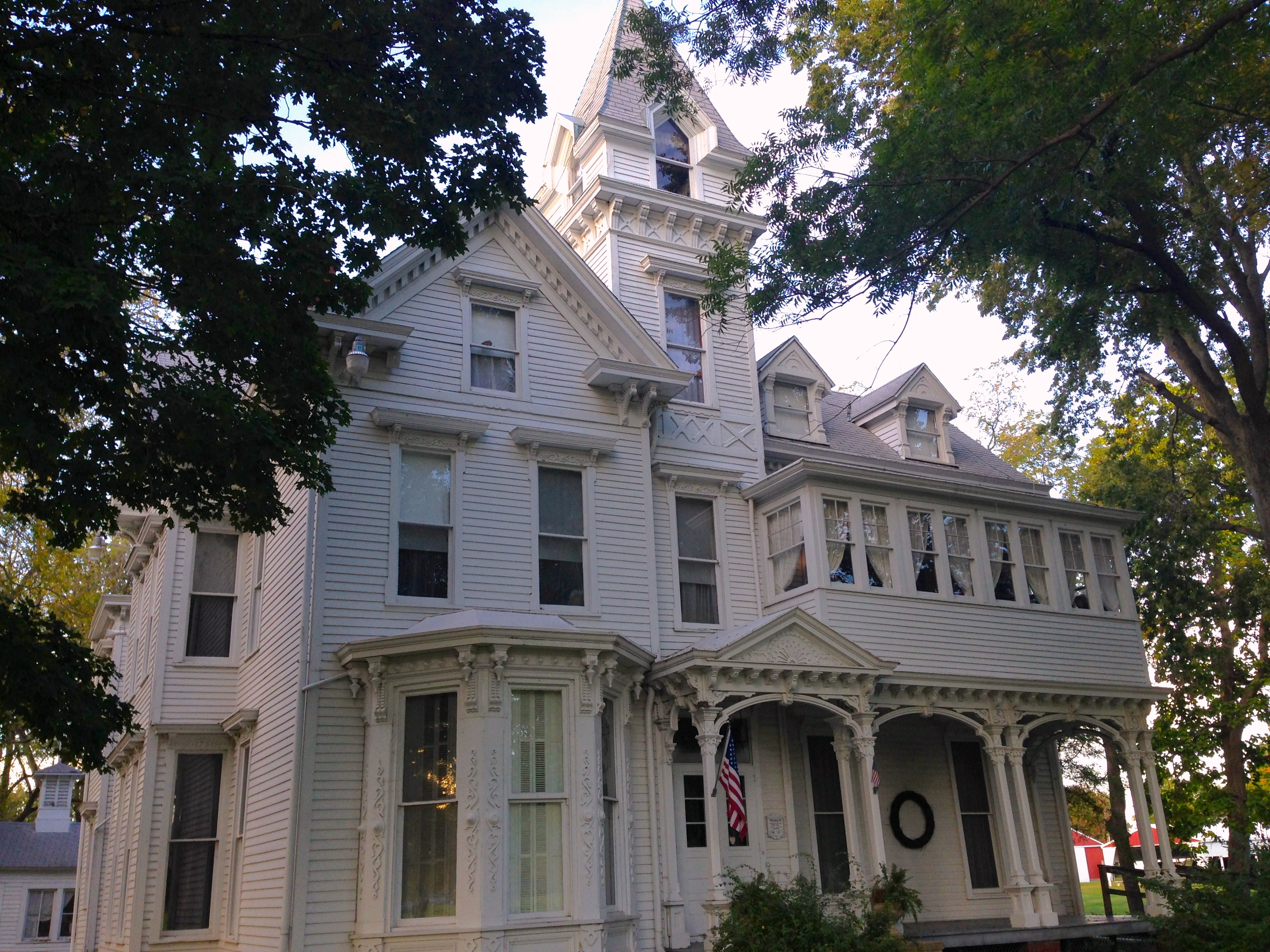

- Location within Illinois Location within the United States
- Location: 920 W. Breckenridge St., Carlinville, Illinois
- Coordinates: 39°17′28″N 89°53′11″W
- Area: 16.5 acres (6.7 ha)
- Built: 1883
- Architectural style: Stick, Italianate, Queen Anne
- NRHP reference No.: 92001535
- Added to NRHP: November 5, 1992

The John C. Anderson House is a historic house located at 920 W. Breckenridge St. in Carlinville, Illinois. The house's first floor was built in 1883, while its second floor was added in 1892. The first floor has an Italianate design featuring tall, narrow windows, an asymmetrical porch with paired columns, paired brackets, and a dentillated cornice. The second floor is designed in the Queen Anne style and includes a square tower with stick style framework, a multi-component roof with gabled dormers, and a stained glass window with a decorative wooden frame. Local banker C.H.C. Anderson built the house for his son John C. Anderson as a wedding gift; John and his wife Lucy lived in the house until their deaths in the 1930s.

The house is now owned by the Macoupin County Historical Society, which uses it for the Anderson Mansion Museum.

The house was added to the National Register of Historic Places on November 5, 1992.
