= Anderson (footballer, born 1997) =

Brazilian professional footballer

Personal information
- Full name: John Anderson Souza Fonseca
- Date of birth: 3 May 1997 (age 29)
- Place of birth: São Paulo, Brazil
- Height: 1.79 m (5 ft 10 in)
- Position: Forward

Team information
- Current team: Voluntari

Youth career
- –2016: Barcelona-SP

Senior career*
Years	Team	Apps	(Gls)
2016–2017	Barcelona-SP	11	(5)
2018	Leixões B	20	(5)
2018–2020	Freamunde	20	(1)
2020–	Voluntari	10	(0)
- * Club domestic league appearances and goals as of 07:00, 15 June 2021 (UTC)

John Anderson Souza Fonseca (born 3 May 1997), commonly known as Anderson or John Anderson, is a Brazilian professional footballer who plays as a forward for Romanian Liga I side Voluntari. In his career, Anderson also played for teams such as Barcelona Esportivo Capela, Leixões or Freamunde.
