= Anderson Island =

Anderson Island may refer to:

- Anderson Island (Tasmania), Australia
- An island in the Albany River, Northern Ontario, Canada
- Anderson Island (Andaman and Nicobar Islands), India
- Anderson Island (California), US
- Anderson Island (Washington), US

== See also ==
- Little Anderson Island, Tasmania, Australia
- Andersson Island, Tabarin Peninsula, Antarctica
