= Lewis and Clara Anderson House =

- U.S. National Register of Historic Places
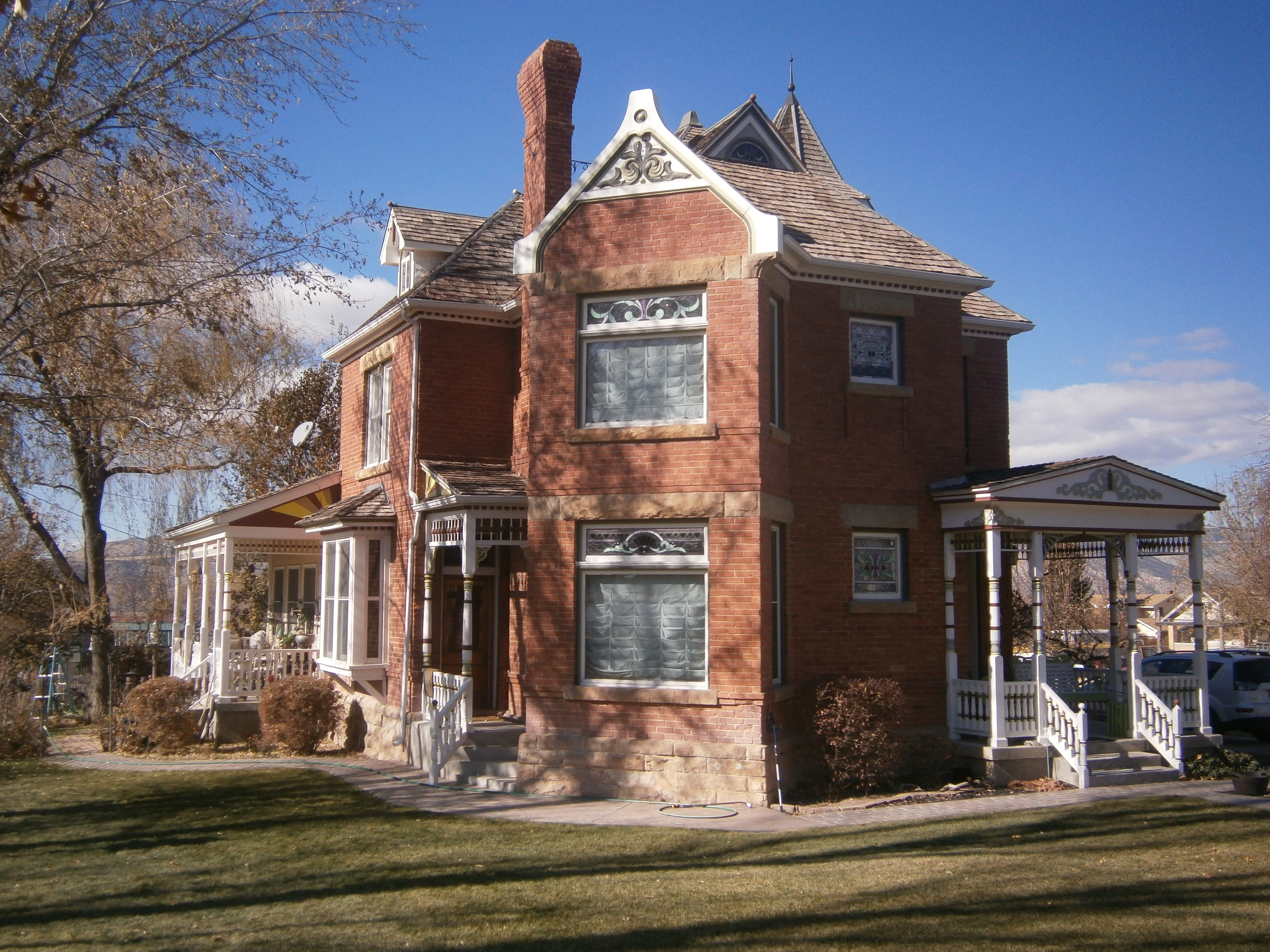

- Location within Utah Location within the United States
- Location: 542 S. Main, Manti, Utah
- Coordinates: 39.257548°N 111.637473°W
- Area: less than one acre
- Built: 1896, c.1920
- Architectural style: Queen Anne
- NRHP reference No.: 97001629
- Added to NRHP: January 12, 1998

The Lewis and Clara Anderson House, at 542 S. Main in Manti, Utah, was built in 1896. It was listed on the National Register of Historic Places in 1998. The listing included three contributing buildings.

The residence is a two-story, brick building of a central-block-with-projecting-bays type. It is "an asymmetrically massed Victorian style house, with Queen Anne detailing and contrasting colors of brick and stone as decorative elements. The house is distinguished by its unusual massing and arrangement of wings and porches. A carriage house, built c.1920, a chicken coop, built c.1920, and a garage, built in 1996, are also located on the property. Mature trees, shrubs, lawn, and flowers are part of a fully landscaped yard."
