= Anderson (automobile) =

Defunct American motor vehicle manufacturer

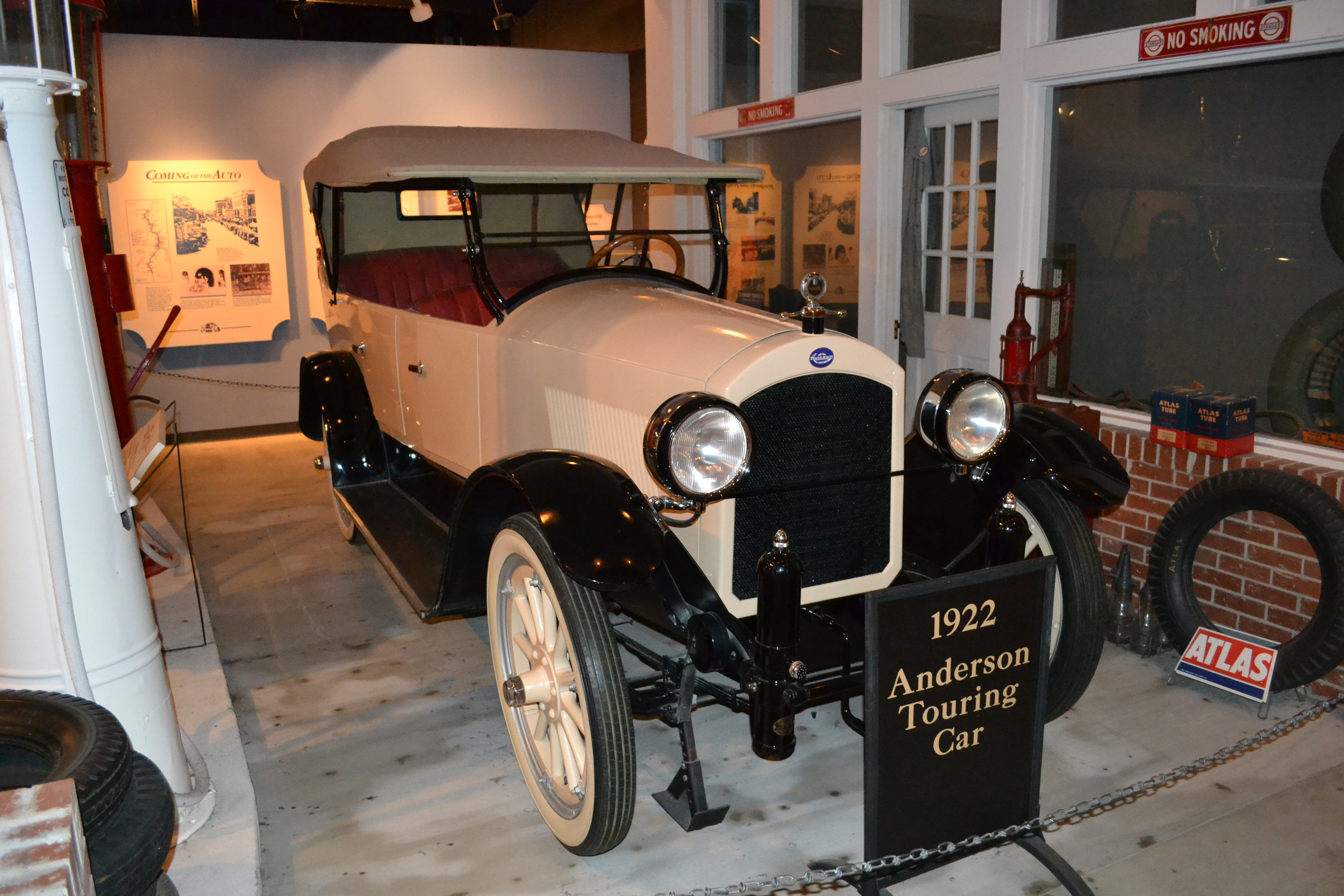
1922 Anderson Touring car at the South Carolina State Museum

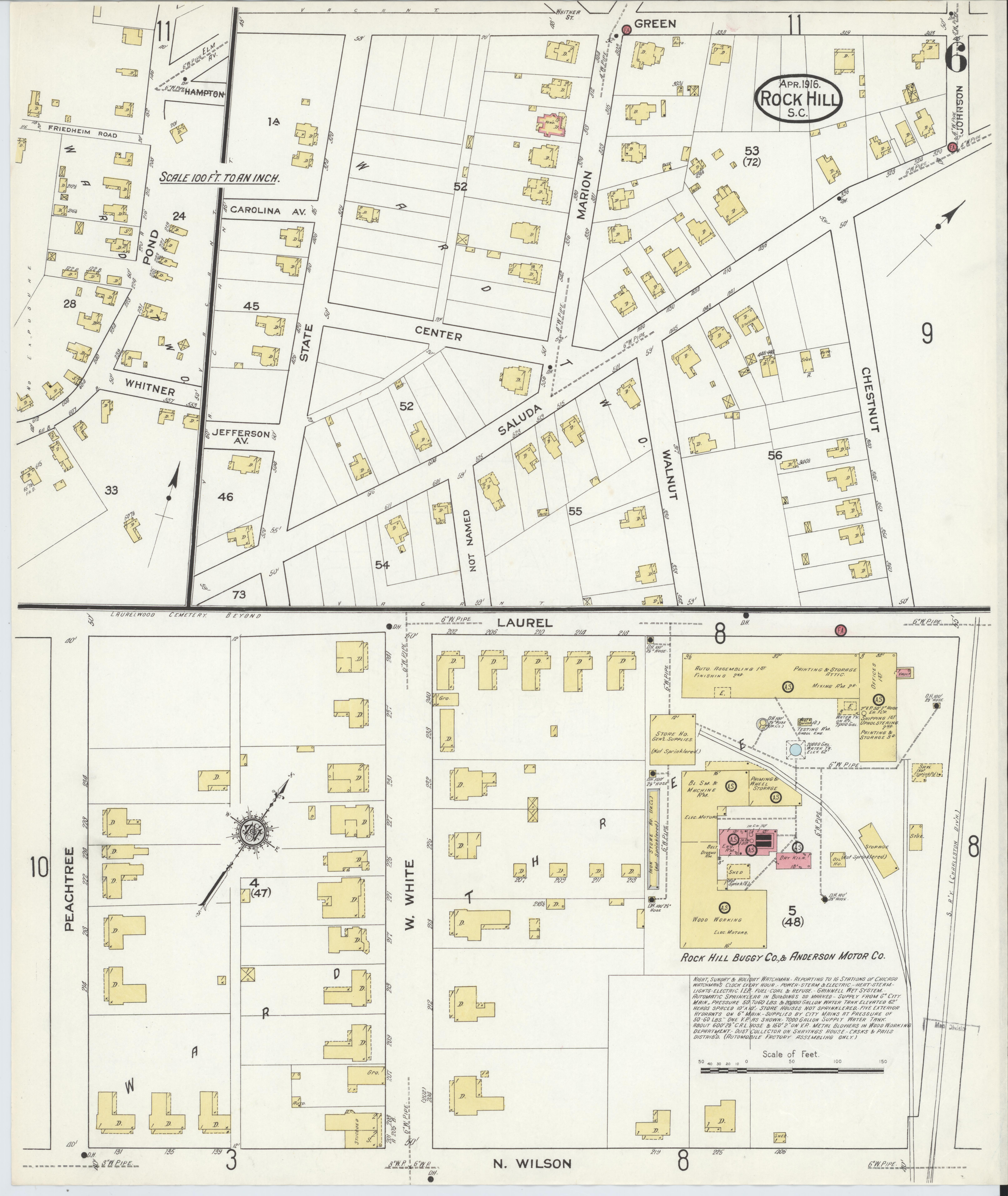
Anderson Plant (1916)

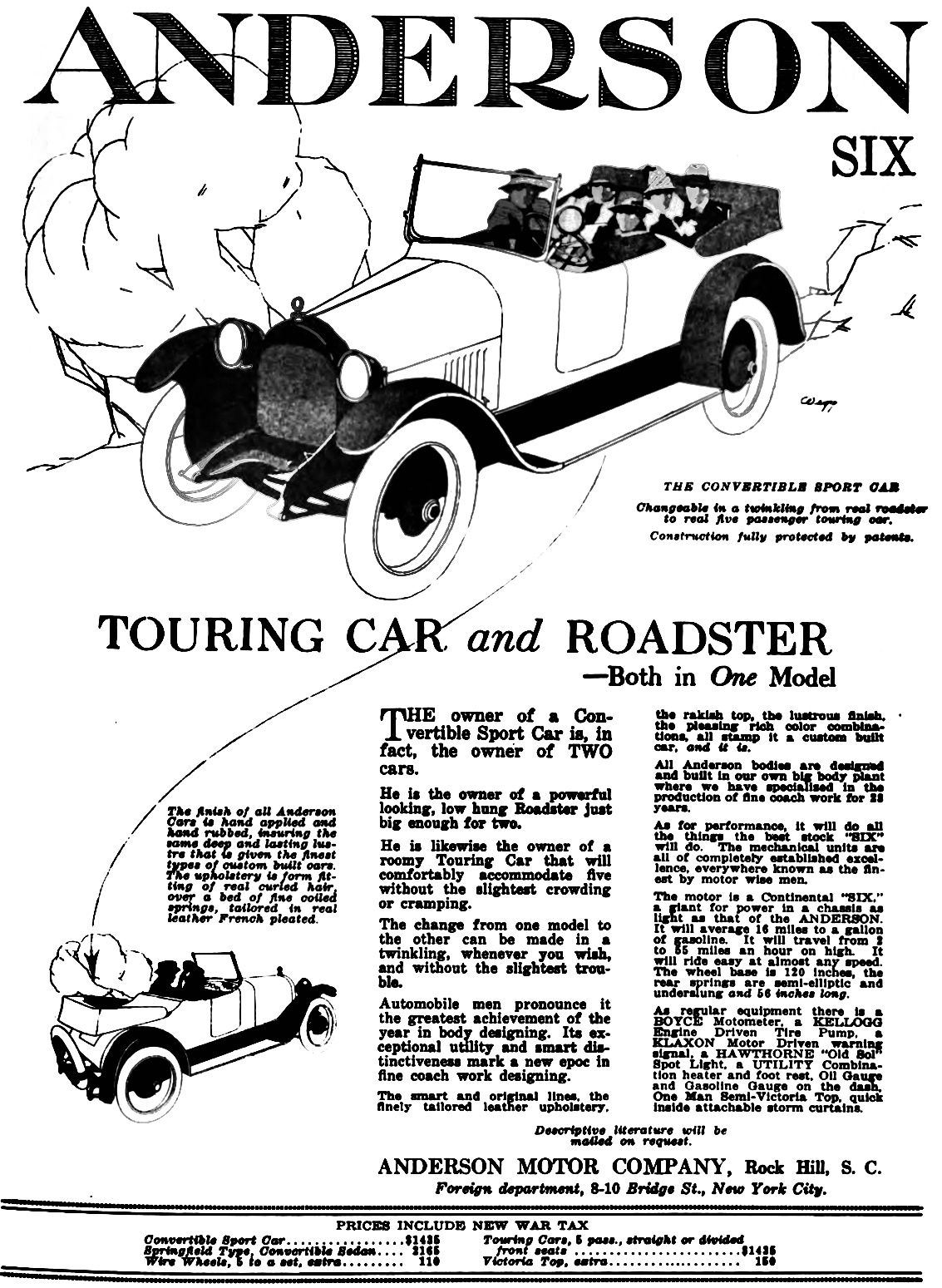
Anderson six (1917)

The Anderson was a United States automobile; considered the most successful automobile ever built in the Southern United States, it was manufactured by a carriage works from 1916 to 1925 in Rock Hill, South Carolina. Started by John Gary Anderson, the company sold cars through a national dealer network. The company used Continental 7R flathead six engines in its vehicles, which were noted for their attractive body styles and color combinations. Andersons were the first cars to be built with headlight foot dimmers and powered convertible tops. Production reached nearly 2,000 units in 1923 and in all 7,000 vehicles were produced during the life of the company.

There are a number of reasons why the Anderson Automobile Co. failed. According to Edward Lee, who wrote the 2007 book John Gary Anderson and His Maverick Motor Company: The Rise and Fall of Henry Ford's Rock Hill Rival, the vehicle suffered from a defective engine. Anderson bought most of the components from other manufacturers. During the later years of production, Anderson used a Continental engine with an aluminum head and it warped at high temperatures.

Price was also an issue, Lee believes. Model T Fords were selling for as little as $290 in the 1920s, making the cars affordable to the majority of Americans. Andersons cost about $1,650 for a five-passenger touring car and $2,550 for a sedan. Anderson's slogan was a "A little Higher in Price but made in Dixie." Anderson's strategy was to invest in the opulence of his vehicles, hoping that consumers would be willing to pay a higher price in return. The strategy failed because customers were more price-sensitive than Anderson anticipated.

In addition, by the early 1920s, the economy of South Carolina and other Southern states were already declining, well ahead of the Great Depression, because of plummeting cotton prices following World War I. The Anderson Automobile Co. was liquidated in 1926. Later in life, John Gary Anderson criticized the city of Rock Hill for failing to give his company financial assistance.

Today, there are just 13 remaining examples of Anderson vehicles in existence. Of those Anderson cars known to exist, four are owned by the Anderson family, one is at the South Carolina State Museum in Columbia and one is in the possession of the Museum of York County, where Rock Hill is located.

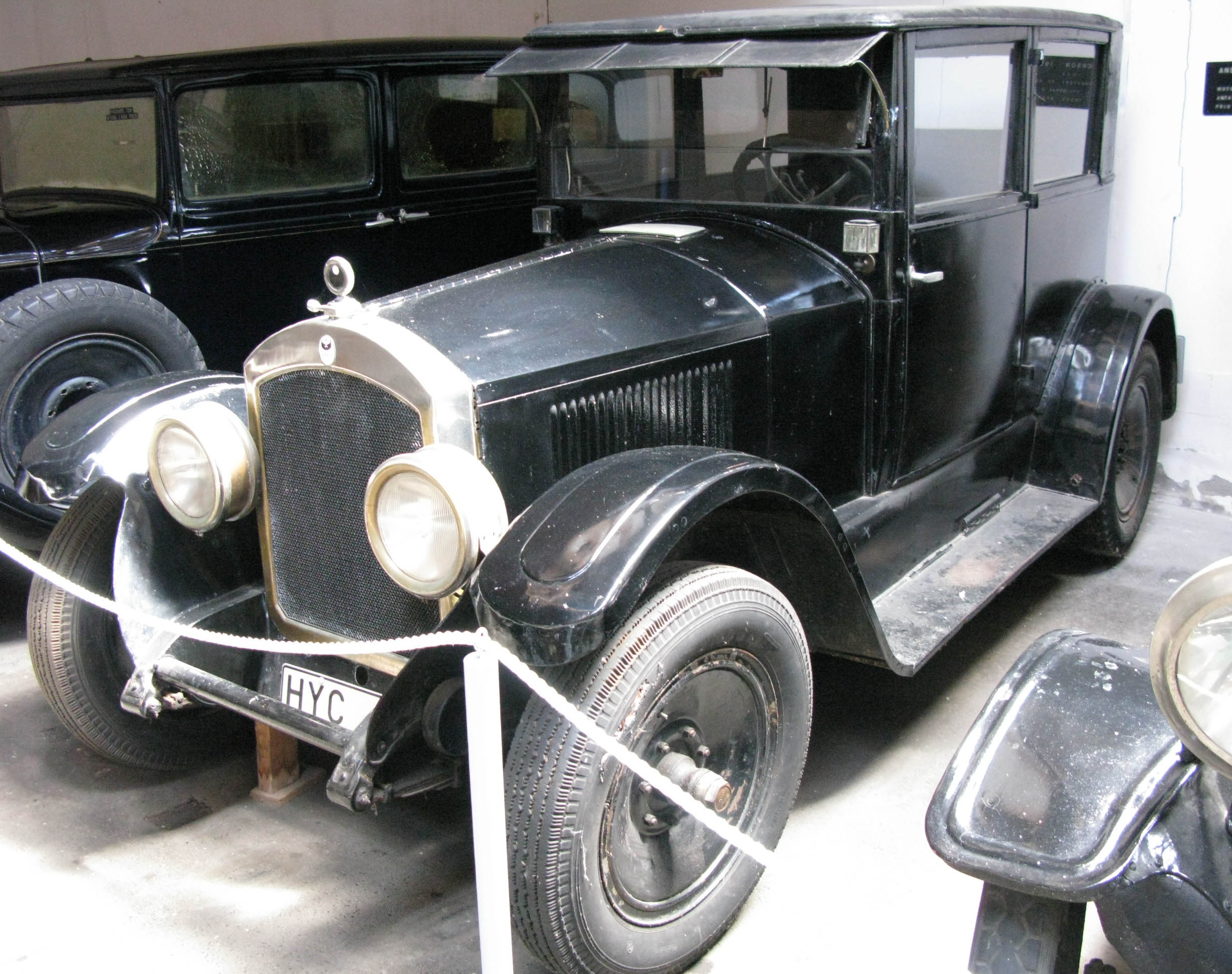
Anderson automobile from 1923

== Production models ==
- Anderson Model 101 (1916) Runabout
- Anderson Model 202 (1916) six passenger Touring
