= Ludwig Anderson Three-Decker =

- U.S. National Register of Historic Places
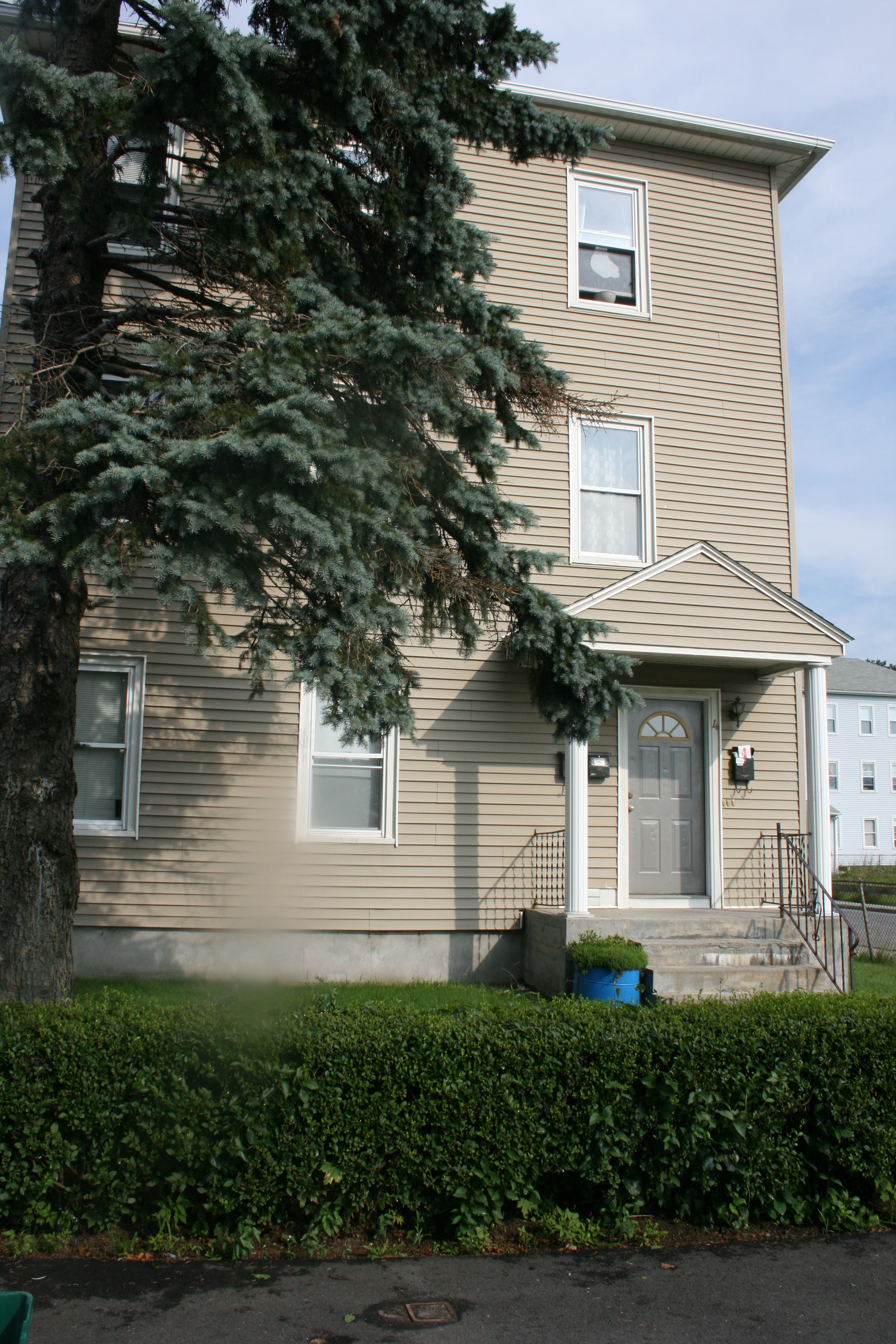

- Location within Massachusetts Location within the United States
- Location: 4 Fairbanks St., Worcester, Massachusetts
- Coordinates: 42°14′41″N 71°47′42″W
- Area: less than one acre
- Built: 1896
- Architectural style: Italianate
- MPS: Worcester Three-Deckers TR
- NRHP reference No.: 89002355
- Added to NRHP: February 9, 1990

The Ludwig Anderson Three-Decker is a historic triple decker house in Worcester, Massachusetts. Built c. 1896, it was a good example of a vernacular Italianate triple decker, whose exterior decoration has since been removed or covered over. It was listed on the National Register of Historic Places in 1990.

== Description and history ==
The Ludwig Anderson Three-Decker is located on Vernon Hill south of downtown Worcester, at the western corner of Fairbanks and Stockton Streets. It is a three-story wood-frame structure, with a shallow hip roof. Its main facade is three bays wide, with the main entrance in the rightmost bay, sheltered by a gabled portico with round columns. The interior follows a typical side hall plan, with a stairwell on the right providing access to the building's three units. Its historic exterior features have been compromised by the application of synthetic siding. These features included a modillioned cornice, window surrounds with rope moulding on the caps, and an early 20th-century portico with paired square columns.

The house was built about 1896, and was typical of early triple-deckers built to house workers in the factories of South Worcester and Quinsigamond Village. Its first owners, and a number of its early tenants, were Swedish immigrants. Ludwig Anderson, whose family owned it into the 1930s, was a grocer who also lived here, while early tenants were machinists, factory workers, and others engaged in lower-paid jobs.

== See also ==
- National Register of Historic Places listings in eastern Worcester, Massachusetts
