= Anderson House (Rock Hill, South Carolina) =

Historic house in South Carolina, United States

- U.S. National Register of Historic Places
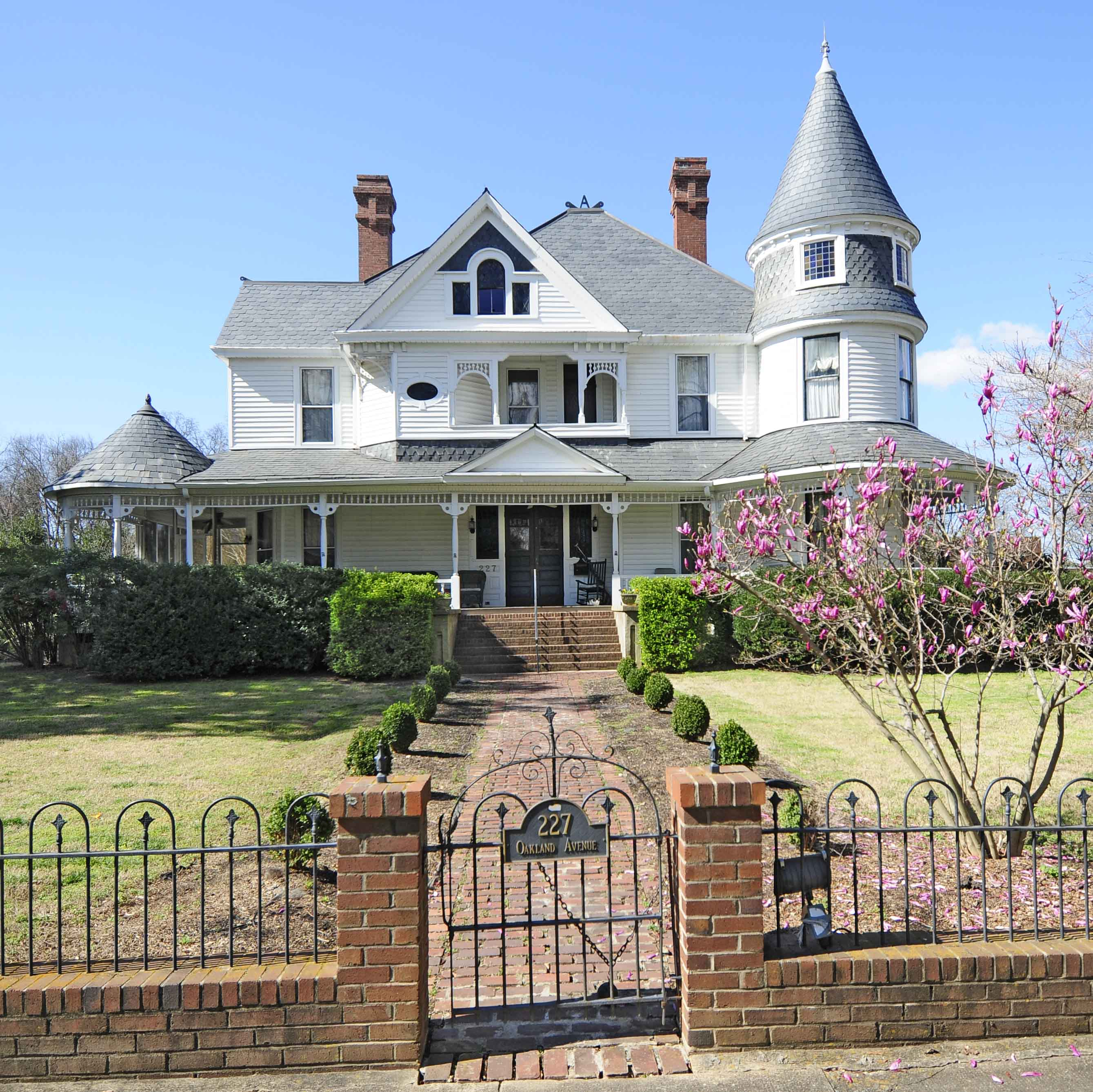

- Location within South Carolina
- Location: 227 Oakland Ave., Rock Hill, South Carolina
- Coordinates: 34°55′54″N 81°1′34″W
- Area: 1 acre (0.40 ha)
- Built: 1898
- Built by: A.D. Holler
- Architectural style: Queen Anne
- NRHP reference No.: 82003908
- Added to NRHP: May 13, 1982

Anderson House is the former residence of John Gary Anderson, who was president of the Anderson Motor Company in Rock Hill, South Carolina. It was listed on the National Register of Historic Places in 1982.

== History of John Gary Anderson ==
John Gary Anderson (1861-1937) married Alice Louetta Holler of Rock Hill in 1884. He then entered into business with his father-in-law to found the Holler and Anderson Buggy Company. By 1905 he was the sole owner of the company, and its name had been changed to Anderson Motor Company. By 1916 the company offered its first car for sale, a luxury coupe costing $1,500. By 1924 the company had ceased production and officially closed its doors in 1925.

Anderson was a key figure in developing Rock Hill. He founded the Rock Hill Chamber of Commerce and served as its first president. He installed the area's first telephone exchange, which morphed into the Rock Hill Telephone Company. He initiated plans for paving the city's streets and sidewalks. He lobbied for a US Post Office in the city; it became a reality in the late 1890s. He also lobbied for establishment of a US District Court in the city; that effort was also ultimately successful. He was a member of the Winthrop Board of Trustees, a position he maintained until his death.

In 1911 Anderson formulated a plan to reduce the amount of acreage being planted in cotton in the South, and he traveled widely to encourage adoption of the plan. His efforts were recognized as successfully maintaining the price of cotton during the 1910s.

== The House ==
Anderson had the house built in 1898 by A. D. Holler, a local contractor, using published plans of George Franklin Barber, a nationally known architect. He and his family occupied it thereafter; its application for Historic Status was signed by Alice Anderson Gill, a daughter of the family.

== Architecture ==
The house has two and one-half stories. The architecture is Queen Anne, based on a published plan of George Franklin Barber, a Tennessee architect. It incorporates a three-story turret with a conical roof on the north corner of the façade. A one-story porch wraps around the turret and spans the façade, with an attached gazebo at the south end. The walls are framed; the roof covering is slate, with metal crestings. It includes two brick chimneys with corbelled caps.
