= Elijah Teague Anderson House =

Historic house in Missouri, United States

- U.S. National Register of Historic Places
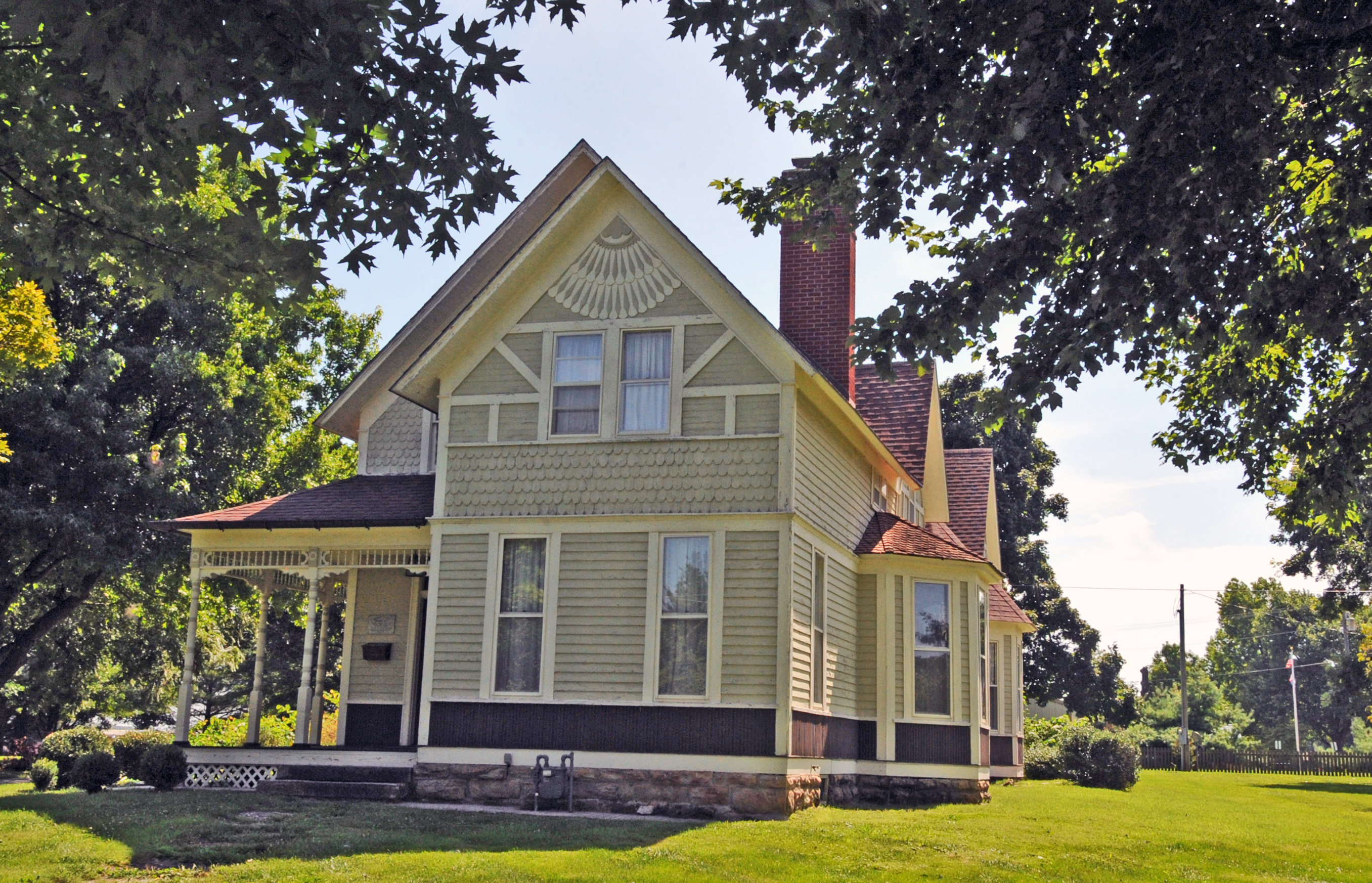
- Elijah Teague Anderson House, January 2009

- Location within Missouri Location within the United States
- Location: 406 N. Pine St., Republic, Missouri
- Coordinates: 37°7′22″N 93°28′44″W
- Area: 1.3 acres (0.53 ha)
- Built: 1885
- Built by: Anderson, Elijah T.; Et al.
- Architectural style: Vernacular Queen Anne
- NRHP reference No.: 80002353
- Added to NRHP: November 14, 1980

Elijah Teague Anderson House is a historic home located at Republic, Greene County, Missouri. It was built in 1885, and is a two-story, vernacular Queen Anne style weatherboarded frame dwelling. It has a fieldstone foundation and steeply pitched intersecting gable roof. It features a Stick Style overlay and fishscale shingles.

It was listed on the National Register of Historic Places in 1980.
