= Charles B. Anderson House =

Historic house in Florida, United States

- U.S. National Register of Historic Places
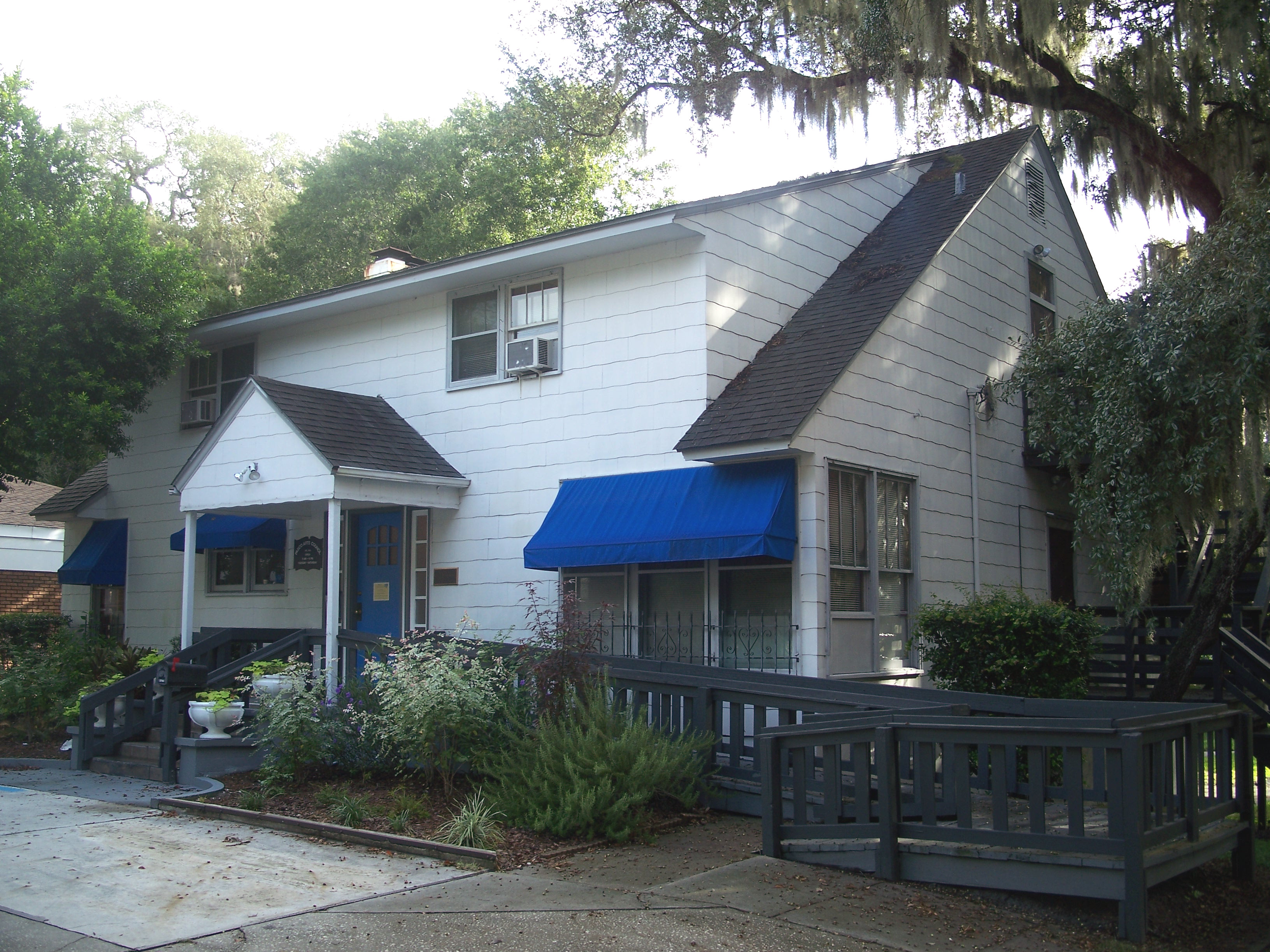

- Location within Florida Location within the United States
- Location: 5744 Moog Road, Elfers, Florida
- Coordinates: 28°12′31″N 82°43′9″W
- Area: less than one acre
- Built: 1938
- Architect: Garry Boyle, Guy Kuenzi
- Architectural style: Frame Vernacular
- NRHP reference No.: 96000467
- Added to NRHP: 26 April 1996

The Charles B. Anderson House was an historic house in Elfers, Florida, United States owned by Pasco County. On April 26, 1996, it was added to the U.S. National Register of Historic Places.
