= Anderson (footballer, born 1985) =

Association football player (born 1985)

Personal information
- Full name: Anderson Souza Ferreira
- Date of birth: 9 May 1985 (age 41)
- Place of birth: Itabuna, Brazil
- Position: Right wing back

Senior career*
| Years | Team | Apps | (Gls) |
| 2007–2010 | Vitória | 1 | (0) |
| 2008 | → Treze (loan) | 0 | (0) |
| 2009 | → Ipitanga (loan) | 0 | (0) |
| 2009 | → Galícia (loan) | 0 | (0) |

International career
| 2007 | Equatorial Guinea | 2 | (0) |
- * Club domestic league appearances and goals

Anderson Souza Ferreira (born 9 May 1985), known simply as Anderson, is a former footballer who played as a defender. Born in Brazil, he has played for the Equatorial Guinea national team.

== Biography ==
Anderson was born in Itabuna, a city located in the Brazilian state of Bahia.

== International career ==
Anderson was one of the Brazilian-born naturalized Equatoguinean players by the Brazilian Antônio Dumas (Equatorial Guinea's former coach). Through his naturalization, he has been an international for the Equatoguinean national team on 25 March 2007. He played in an Africa Cup of Nations 2007 Qualifying match against Rwanda, in Malabo, a game which the national team won 3–1. Also he was called for other 2008 Africa Cup of Nations qualification match against Rwanda in Kigali on 2 June 2007.
