= Alfred C. and Annie L. Olsen Anderson House =

- U.S. National Register of Historic Places
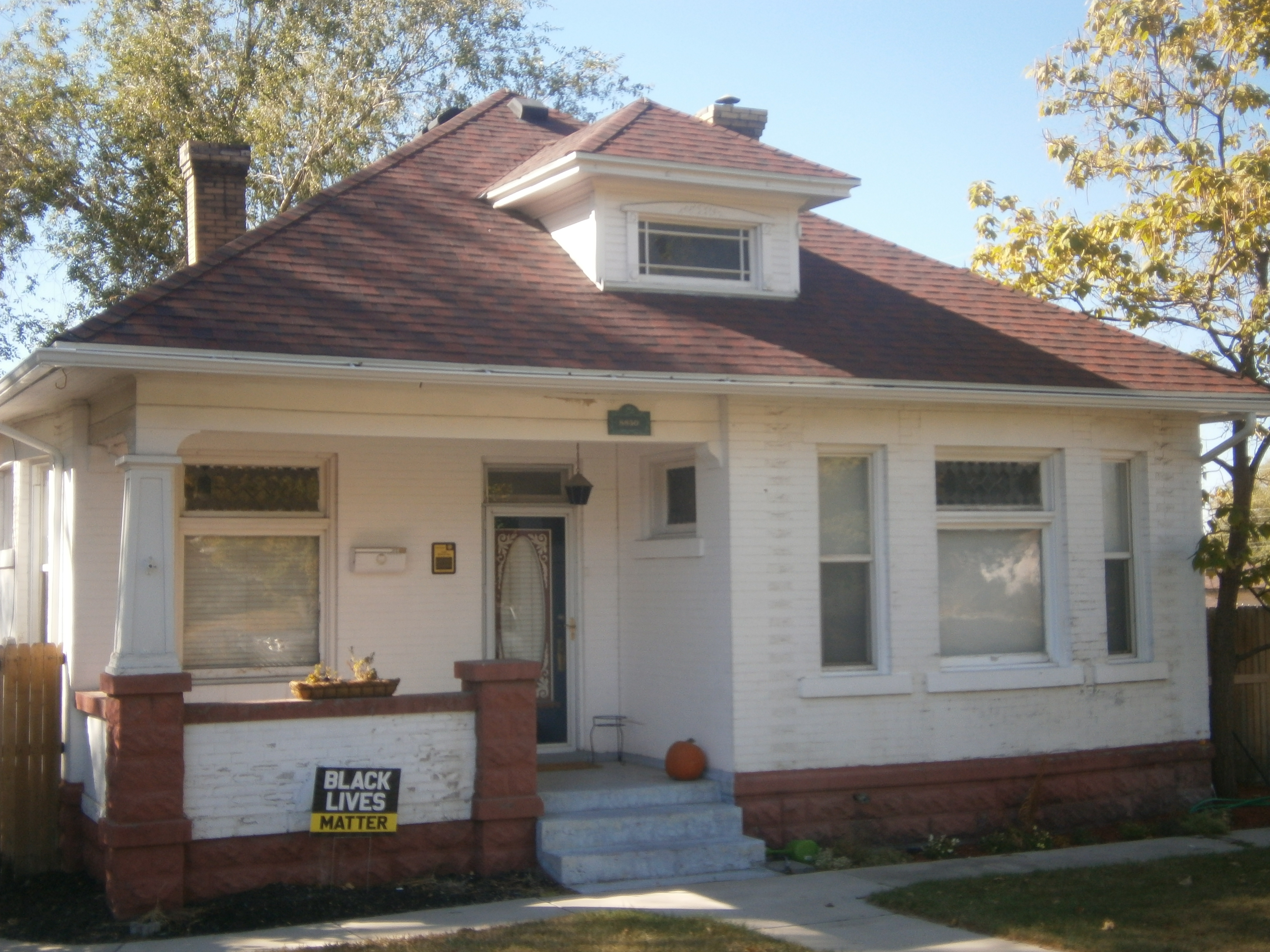

- Location within Utah Location within the United States
- Location: 8850 South 60 East, Sandy, Utah
- Coordinates: 40°35′27″N 111°53′17″W
- Area: 0.3 acres (0.12 ha)
- Built: c.1916
- Part of: Sandy Historic District
- MPS: Sandy City MPS
- NRHP reference No.: 99001556
- Added to NRHP: December 9, 1999

The Alfred C. and Annie L. Olsen Anderson House, located at 8850 South 60 East in Sandy, Utah, was constructed around 1916. This historic dwelling earned a place on the National Register of Historic Places in 1999, and is also a featured component of the National Register-listed Sandy Historic District.

This one-story residence is fashioned from buff brick and boasts a nearly pyramidal roof.

Notably, the house holds significance as "an interesting example of Sandy's residential architecture in transition during the early twentieth century. The house is essentially a transitional Victorian cottage, displaying the influence of both the bungalow style and Craftsman movement."

Alfred was born near Oslo, Norway; Annie was from Salt Lake City.
