= Niels Ole Anderson House =

- U.S. National Register of Historic Places
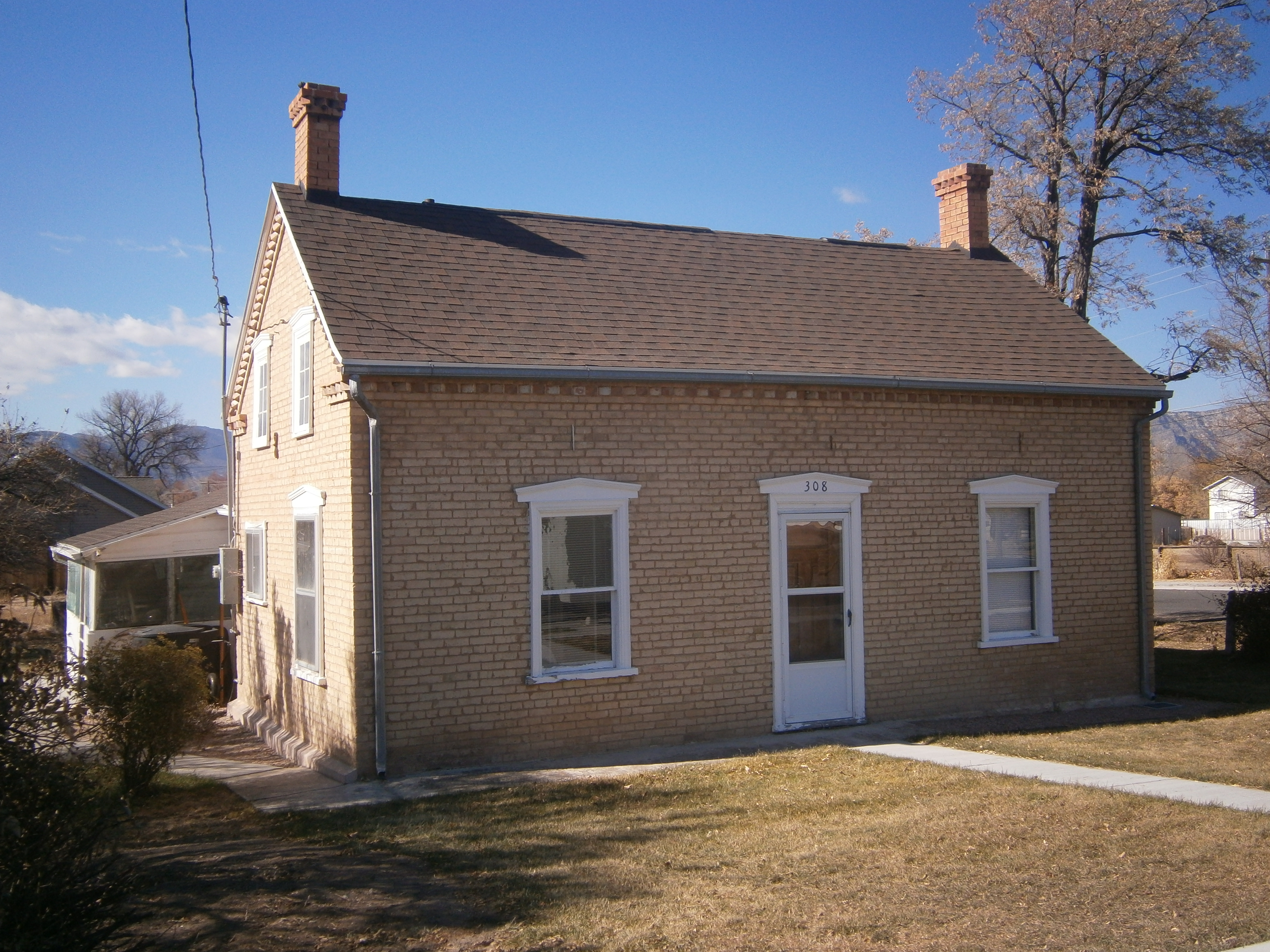

- Location within Utah Location within the United States
- Location: 308 South 100 East, Ephraim, Utah
- Coordinates: 39.354268°N 111.584530°W
- Area: less than one acre
- Built: 1868
- Architectural style: Greek Revival, Federal
- NRHP reference No.: 78002687
- Added to NRHP: October 5, 1978

The Niels Ole Anderson House is a historic house in Ephraim, Utah. It was built in 1868 for Niels Ole Anderson, an immigrant from Sweden whose parents converted to the Church of Jesus Christ of Latter-day Saints and settled in Utah in 1854–1855, when Anderson was ten years old. He served in the Black Hawk War in 1865. Anderson lived in this house, designed with elements of Greek Revival and Federal styles, with his first wife, Josephine Overglade, and their nine children. He served as a missionary in his native Sweden from 1880 to 1882. After his wife died in 1884, he married Matilda Nielson in 1885, and they had a son, Niels Henry. The house was inherited by his ancestors. It has been listed on the National Register of Historic Places since October 5, 1978.

It is at the southwest corner of E. 300 South and S. 100 East.
