= Fort Anderson =

Fort Anderson can refer to:

- Fort Anderson (Kentucky); A Union fort used in the American Civil War and site of the Battle of Paducah, Kentucky
- Fort Anderson (North Carolina); A Confederate fort used in the American Civil War
- Fort Anderson Located across from New Bern, North Carolina and the site of the Battle of Fort Anderson
- Fort Anderson (California); Fort Anderson California State Military Department
- Fort Anderson (Tennessee); Site of a state militia encampment during the Coal Creek War
- Fort Anderson — a Hudson's Bay Company post on the Anderson River (Northwest Territories), Canada
