= Andersen (disambiguation) =

Andersen is a surname. It may also refer to:

- Andersen, a professional services firm in the US that provides tax, valuation, financial advisory, and consulting services
- Andersen Air Force Base, Guam, a United States Air Force base
- Andersen Consulting, former name of Accenture, Plc
- Andersen Corporation, a manufacturer of windows and other building supplies
- Andersen Global, an international association of legally separate, independent member firms
- Andersen Press, a publisher

== See also ==
- Andersen's disease
- Arthur Andersen, a former tax and consulting firm
- Pea Soup Andersen's, a restaurant chain in California
