= Rascoe-Harris Farm =

Historic house in Tennessee, United States

- U.S. National Register of Historic Places
- U.S. Historic district
- Location within Tennessee Location within the United States
- Nearest city: Gallatin, Tennessee
- Coordinates: 36°24′24″N 86°30′42″W
- Area: 64 acres (26 ha)
- Built: 1824
- Architectural style: Federal
- MPS: Historic Family Farms in Middle Tennessee MPS
- NRHP reference No.: 96000772
- Added to NRHP: July 19, 1996

The Rascoe-Harris Farm, also known as the Anderson Farm or Maplewood Farm, is a historic farmhouse in Sumner County, Tennessee, U.S. near Gallatin. It was built circa 1824 for Thomas Howell Rascoe, a farmer who owned six slaves in 1830. After the American Civil War of 1861–1865, some slaves became tenant farmers. The farm was purchased by Green B. Paris in 1891.

The house was designed in the Federal architectural style. It has been listed on the National Register of Historic Places since July 19, 1996.
