= Anderson, Arkansas =

Unincorporated community in Arkansas, U.S.

Coordinates: 34°54′44″N 94°07′18″W

Anderson is an unincorporated community in Scott County, in the U.S. state of Arkansas.

== History ==
Anderson developed along the Arkansas Western Railroad line which was extended to that point in 1901. A variant name is "Anderson Crossing". Many of the communities first inhabitants were Native Americans from the Mississippian era of the United States. It has also been suggested that it was likely named after the Anderson family who came to Scott County from Dade County, Georgia, in the 1880s.
