= Anderson House (Newark, Delaware) =

Historic house in Delaware, United States

- U.S. National Register of Historic Places
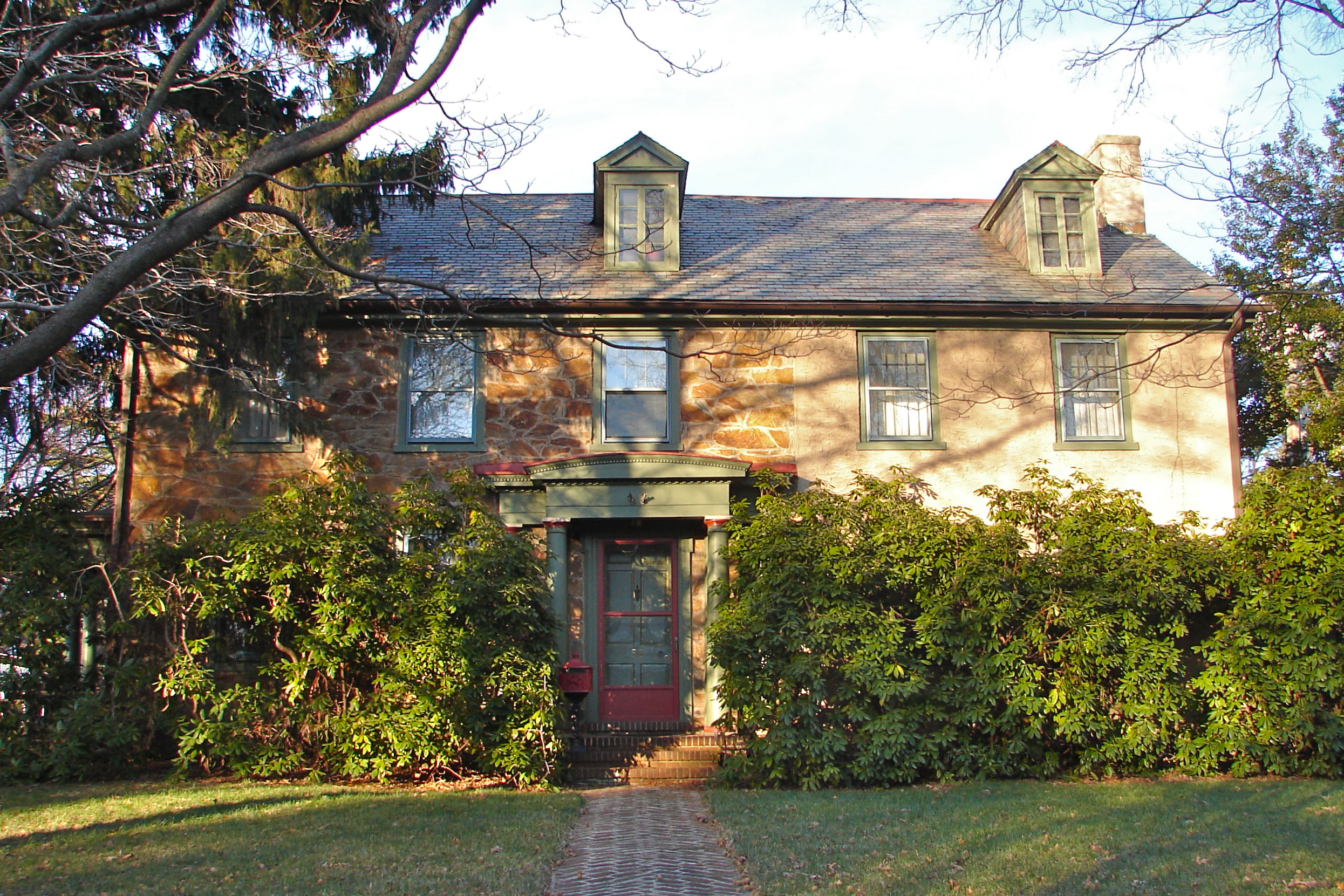
- The Anderson House in 2010

- Location within Delaware Location within the United States
- Location: 58 W. Park Pl., Newark, Delaware
- Coordinates: 39.674985°N 75.756112°W
- Area: 0.4 acres (0.16 ha)
- Built: 1806
- Architectural style: Late 19th And 20th Century Revivals, Georgian
- MPS: Newark MRA
- NRHP reference No.: 83001384
- Added to NRHP: February 24, 1983

The Anderson House is an historic farmhouse in Newark, Delaware. The original stone section of the house dates to 1806, making it one of the city's oldest homes.

== History ==
The original stone house was built in 1806 by James Anderson and his wife.

In 1818, Henry Whitely, a businessman and legislator, bought the house and 100 acres of land. He continued to acquire nearby land, and in 1840, sold the house and 263 acres of land to James S. Martin.

In 1841, Martin built a Greek Revival mansion next door to the Anderson House and named the resulting estate Deer Park Farm. Martin, who also built the Deer Park Hotel in downtown Newark, sold it in 1862.

The Anderson House remained part of the Deer Park Farm complex until the properties were split around 1909. At some point during this time a two-bay brick addition was constructed on the east side of the house, extending it to the present five-bay block.

During the 1920s and 1930s most of the farmland surrounding the Anderson House was covered by suburban growth. The owner of the house during this period was William F. Wilson, who added a neoclassical portico, dormers, and a rear wing to the building. The house was added to the National Register of Historic Places in 1983.

== Architecture ==
The Anderson House is a two-and-a-half-story, gable-roofed building with a five-bay facade. The three westernmost bays make up the original portion of the building, with irregularly coursed fieldstone walls which are 18 inches (46 cm) thick. The two-bay extension on the east side was added at a later date and features exterior walls of stuccoed brick rather than stone. Dormers, gable-end porches, and a portico with Doric columns were added to the house in the early 20th century.

== See also ==
- National Register of Historic Places listings in Newark, Delaware
