= James E. Collins House =

Historic house in Tennessee, United States

- Formerly listed on the U.S. National Register of Historic Places
- Location: Hillsboro Rd./US 431 1/2 mi. S of Spencer Creek Rd., Franklin, Tennessee
- Area: 5.6 acres (2.3 ha)
- Built: c. 1866
- Architectural style: Central passage plan
- MPS: Williamson County MRA
- NRHP reference No.: 88000344
- Removed from NRHP: January 17, 1995

The James E. Collins House in Franklin, Tennessee, United States, was listed on the National Register of Historic Places but was removed in 1995. The property was also known as Anderson House.

It was built or has other significance as of c.1866, and included Central passage plan and other architecture. When listed the property included one contributing building, one contributing structure, and one non-contributing structure, on an area of 5.6 acres (2.3 ha). The property was covered in a 1988 study of Williamson County historical resources.
