= H. M. Anderson House =

Historic house in Arkansas, United States

- H.M. Anderson House
- U.S. National Register of Historic Places
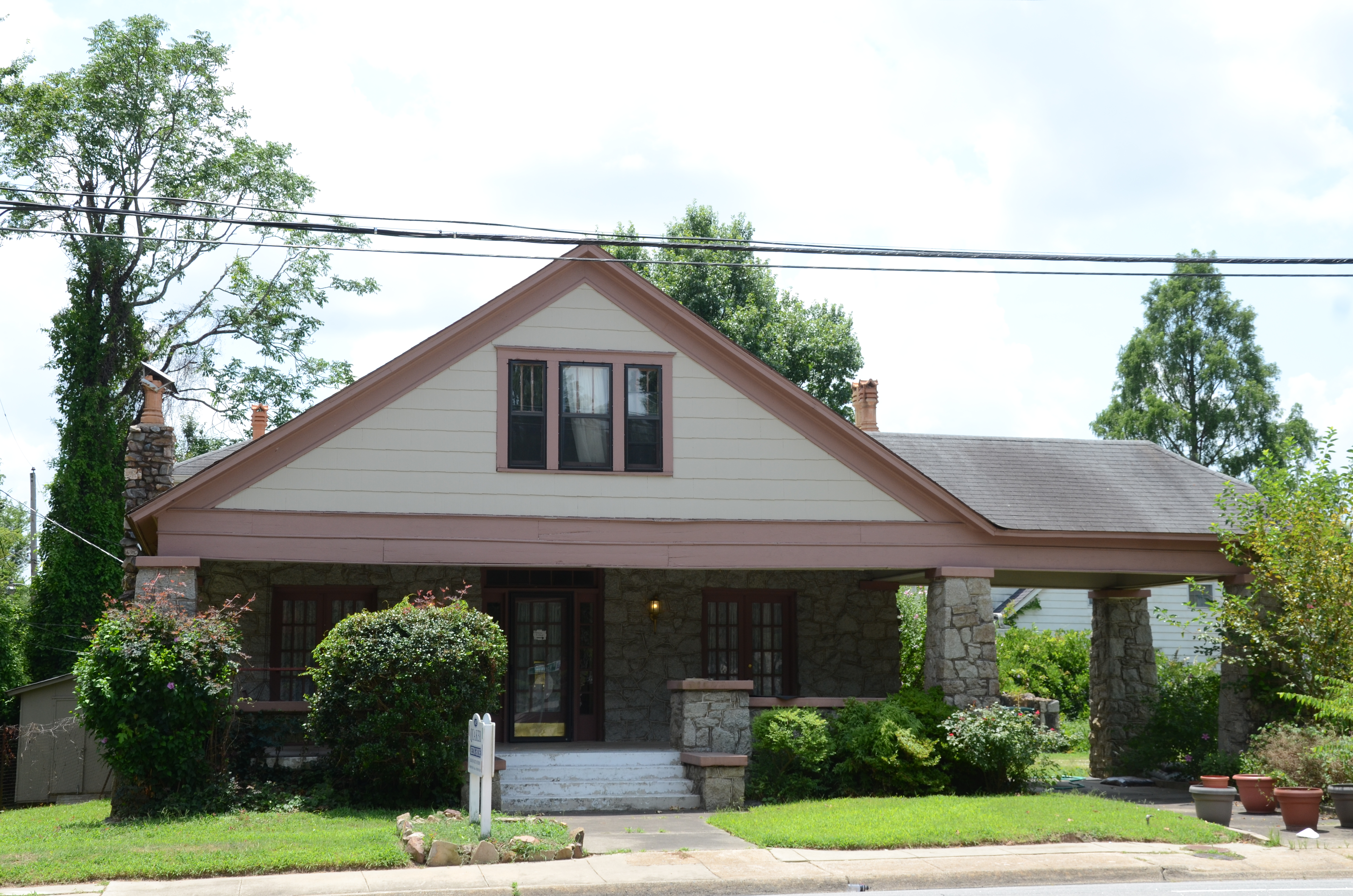

- Location within Arkansas Location within the United States
- Location: 3415 W. Markham, Little Rock, Arkansas
- Coordinates: 34°45′3″N 92°18′41″W
- Area: 1 acre (0.40 ha)
- Built: 1926
- Architectural style: Bungalow/Craftsman
- NRHP reference No.: 01000441
- Added to NRHP: May 2, 2001

The H. M. Anderson House is a historic house in Little Rock, Arkansas.

== Description and history ==
It is a 1 1/2-story stone structure with Craftsman styling. Its first floor front exterior is finished in granite, including the sloping square piers that support its front porch and carport, while the sides and rear are finished in uncoursed rubblestone. The front-facing gable is finished in weatherboard. The interior retains high quality Craftsmen period woodwork and decoration. The house was built in 1926 for Henry M. and Burton Anderson, and is unique in its use of stone in the neighborhood.

The house was listed on the National Register of Historic Places on May 2, 2001.

== See also ==
- National Register of Historic Places listings in Little Rock, Arkansas
