= Helen Anderson House =

Historic house in Arizona, United States

- U.S. National Register of Historic Places
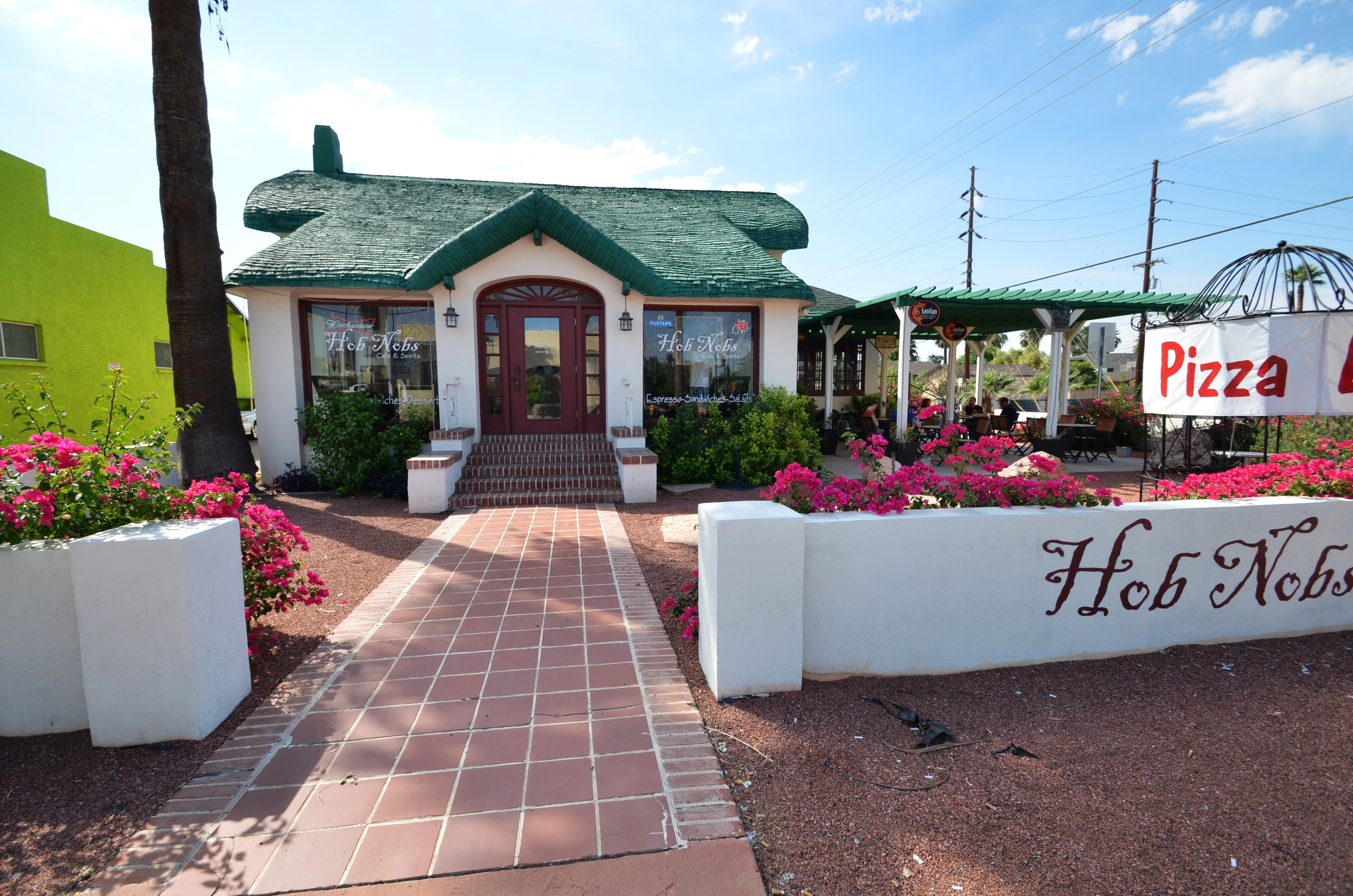

- Location within Arizona Location within the United States
- Location: 149 W. McDowell Rd., Encanto, Phoenix, Arizona
- Coordinates: 33.46551°N 112.07801°W
- Area: less than one acre
- Built: c.1920
- Architectural style: English Cottage Revival
- NRHP reference No.: 83003449
- Added to NRHP: November 30, 1983

The Helen Anderson House, also known as Jutenhoops, is a well preserved English Cottage Revival structure in Phoenix, Arizona. Characteristic of the style, the distinctive roof is composed of wood shingles and rolled eaves that simulate a thatch roof. It was originally built, around 1920, as a residence for Helen Anderson, the widow of insurance company organizer Carl H. Anderson. The house was added to the National Register of Historic Places on November 30, 1983.

It was deemed significant as "the outstanding example of English Cottage Revival architecture in Phoenix."

By 1982 it had been converted for commercial use.

== Location ==
The house is located at 149 W. McDowell Rd., on the southeast corner of its intersection with N. 3rd Ave., in the Encanto neighborhood of Phoenix, and is part of the historic Roosevelt Neighborhood in Phoenix, Arizona.
