= Tiger-Anderson House =

Historic house in Illinois, United States

- U.S. National Register of Historic Places
- Location within Illinois Location within the United States
- Nearest city: Springfield, Illinois
- Coordinates: 39°50′39″N 89°42′31″W
- Area: less than one acre
- Built: 1832
- Architectural style: Greek Revival
- NRHP reference No.: 86001316
- Added to NRHP: June 11, 1986

The Tiger-Anderson House is a historic farmhouse located west of Springfield, Illinois on County Road 3 North. The Greek Revival house was built circa 1832. The two-story brick house has an L-shaped plan. The front entrance is located in the center of the main wing; it features a transom with engaged piers, sidelights on either side, and a flat lintel. Both the main wing and rear ell are topped by gable roofs. Moses K. Anderson, who served as Illinois' adjutant general for eighteen years, lived in the house from 1868 to 1881.

The house was added to the National Register of Historic Places on June 11, 1986.
