= Mons Anderson House =

Historic house in Wisconsin, United States

- U.S. National Register of Historic Places
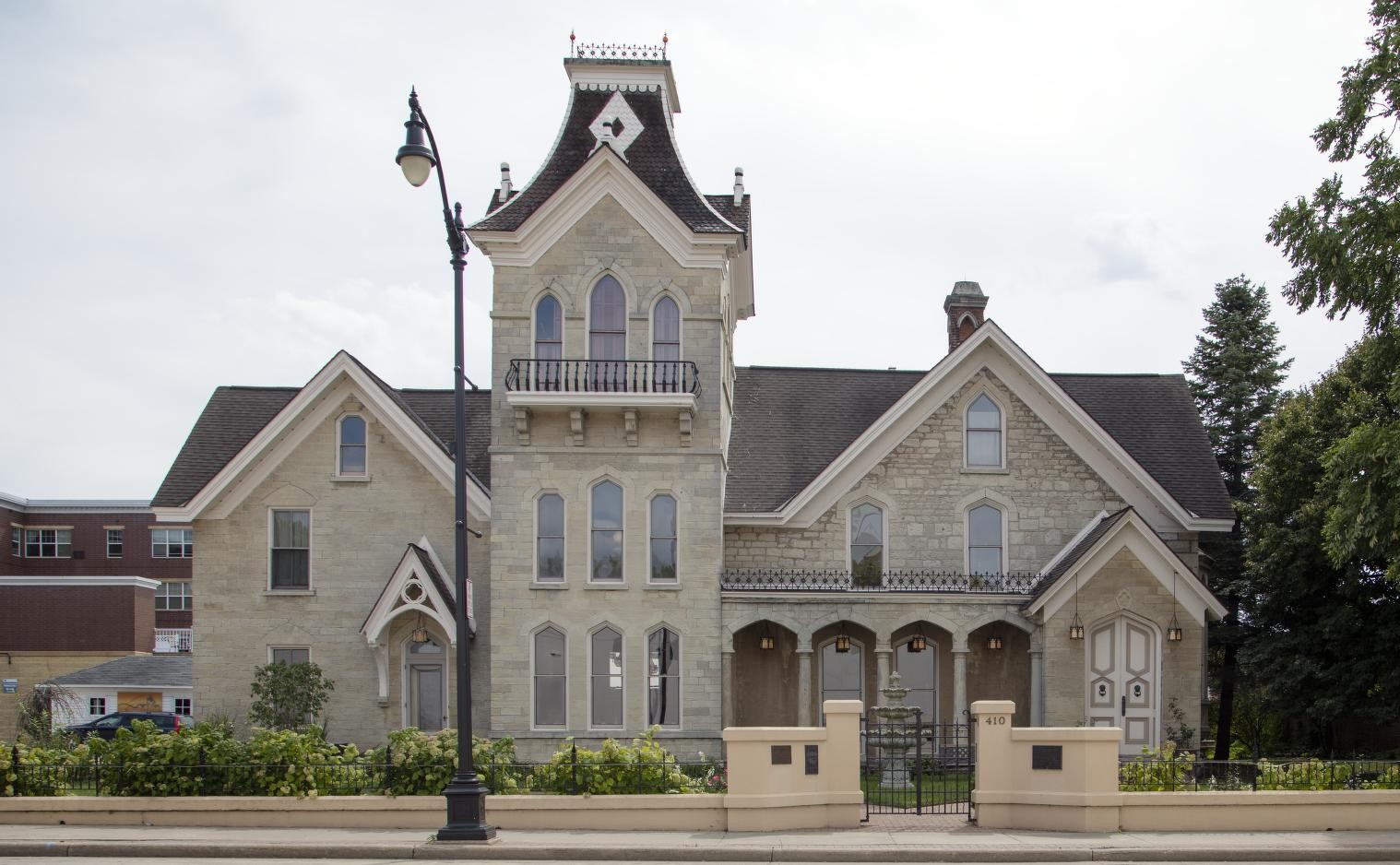
- Mons Anderson House

- Location within Wisconsin
- Location: 410 Cass St. La Crosse, Wisconsin
- Coordinates: 43.8085°N 91.2512°W
- Built: 1854-1855
- Architectural style: Gothic Revival
- NRHP reference No.: 75000071
- Added to NRHP: May 6, 1975

The Mons Anderson House is a historic house located at 410 Cass Street in La Crosse, Wisconsin.

== History ==
The house was originally built for New York native Andrew W. Shephard. Norwegian immigrant Mons Anderson purchased it in 1861. Anderson would add onto the house in 1878. Following his death, it was sold to the YWCA in 1906. In 1920, it was sold to George Lassig, who owned the house until his death in 1982, at which time it was bought by Robert Poehling. JoAn Lambert Smith later bought the house in 1997. It was later put up for sale again at an asking price of $415,000.

It was added to the National Register of Historic Places on May 6, 1975.
