= D.H. Anderson House =

Historic house in Iowa, United States

- U.S. National Register of Historic Places
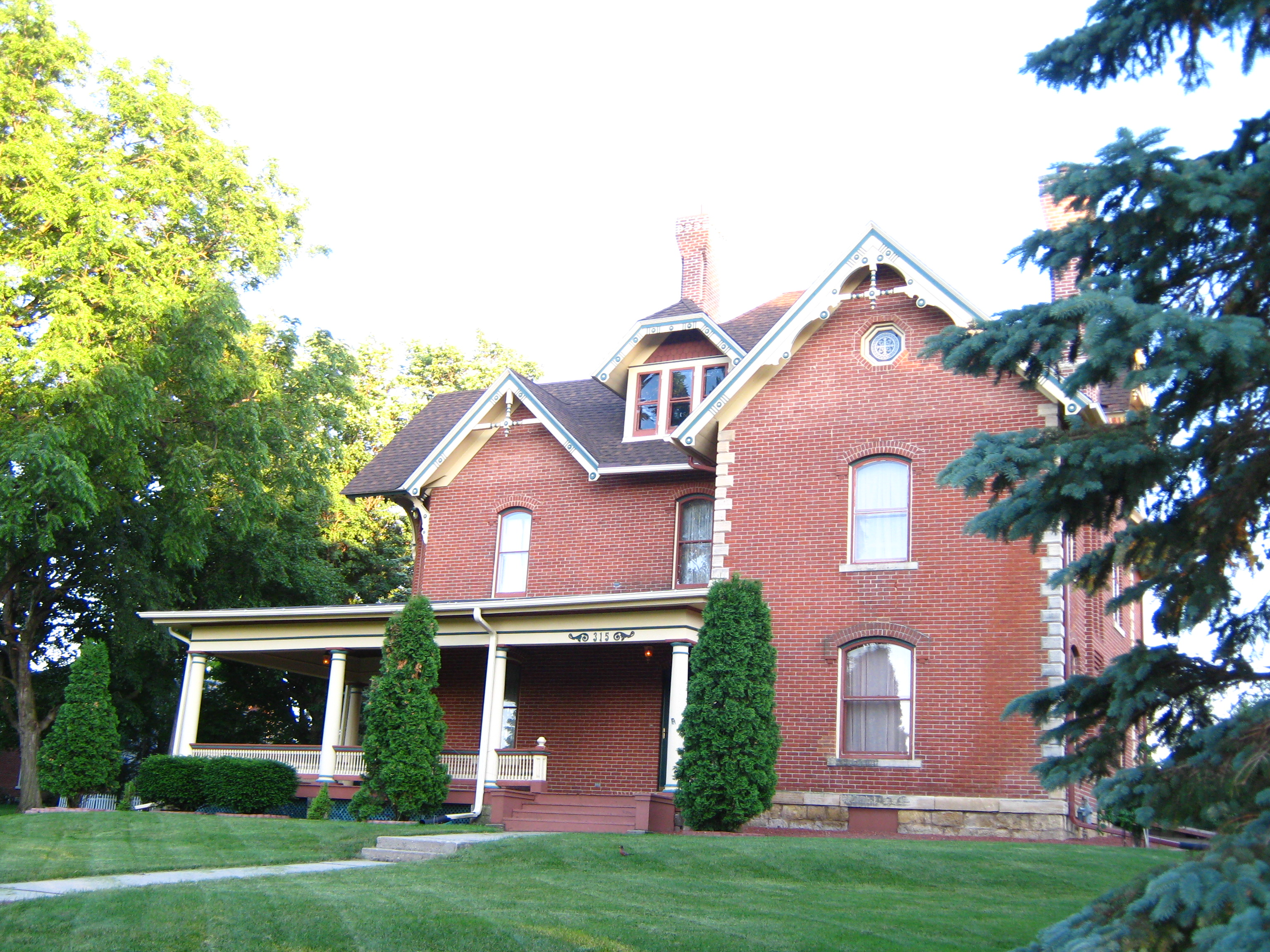

- Location within Iowa Location within the United States
- Location: 315 E. Locust, Maquoketa, Iowa
- Coordinates: 42°03′51″N 90°39′41″W
- Area: less than one acre
- Built: 1888
- Architectural style: Late Victorian
- MPS: Maquoketa MPS
- NRHP reference No.: 91000964
- Added to NRHP: August 9, 1991

The D.H. Anderson House is a historic house located at 315 East Locust in Maquoketa, Iowa.

== Description and history ==
This is one of several houses in town that are noteworthy for their quoined corners, a rare architectural feature in Iowa. The 2½-story brick house features an irregular roofline with both hipped and gabled areas, two large chimneys with corbelled chimney pots, and a wrap-around porch. It was built for D. H. Anderson in 1888 in a section of the city known as "Society Hill." These were financial boom years for Maquoketa. Anderson settled here with his parents in 1854, and grew to become a successful businessman. He married Mary L. Goodenow, the daughter of John L. Goodenow, who was known as the "Father of Maquoketa."

The house was listed on the National Register of Historic Places on August 9, 1991. The D.H. Anderson Building in downtown is also associated with him.
