= Anderson–Foster House =

Historic house in Virginia, United States

- U.S. National Register of Historic Places
- Virginia Landmarks Register
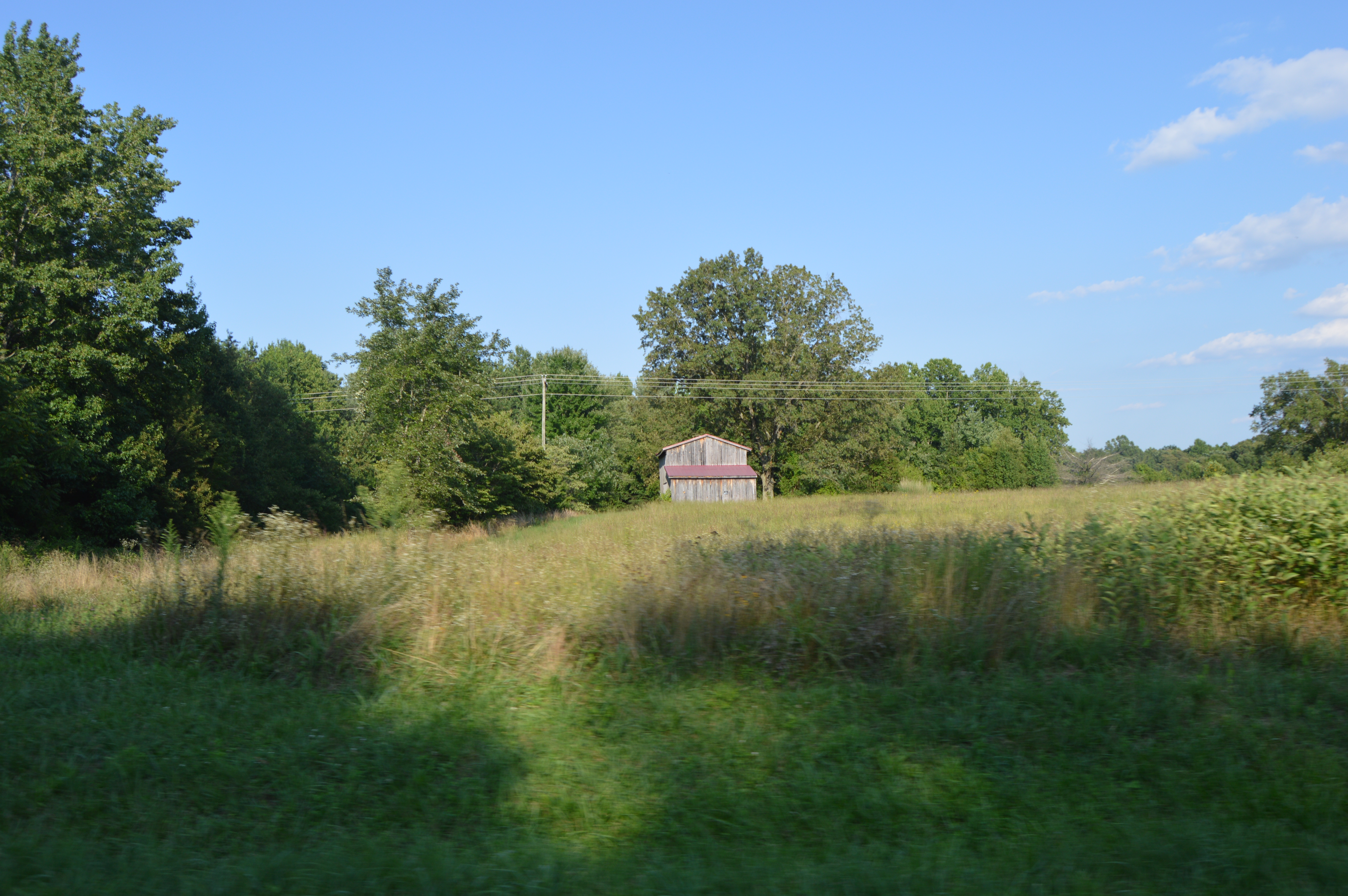
- The Anderson-Foster Farm

- Location within Virginia Location within the United States
- Location: N of Holly Grove, near Holly Grove, Virginia
- Coordinates: 37°48′3″N 77°49′7″W
- Area: 5 acres (2.0 ha)
- Built: 1856
- Architectural style: Greek Revival
- NRHP reference No.: 78003028
- VLR No.: 054-0181

Significant dates
- Added to NRHP: November 17, 1978
- Designated VLR: July 18, 1978

Anderson–Foster House, also known as Foster Place and Sunnyside, is a historic home located near Holly Grove, Louisa County, Virginia. It was built about 1856, and is Greek Revival style dwelling.

It was listed on the National Register of Historic Places in 1978.
