= Leroy Anderson House =

Historic house in Connecticut, United States

- U.S. National Register of Historic Places
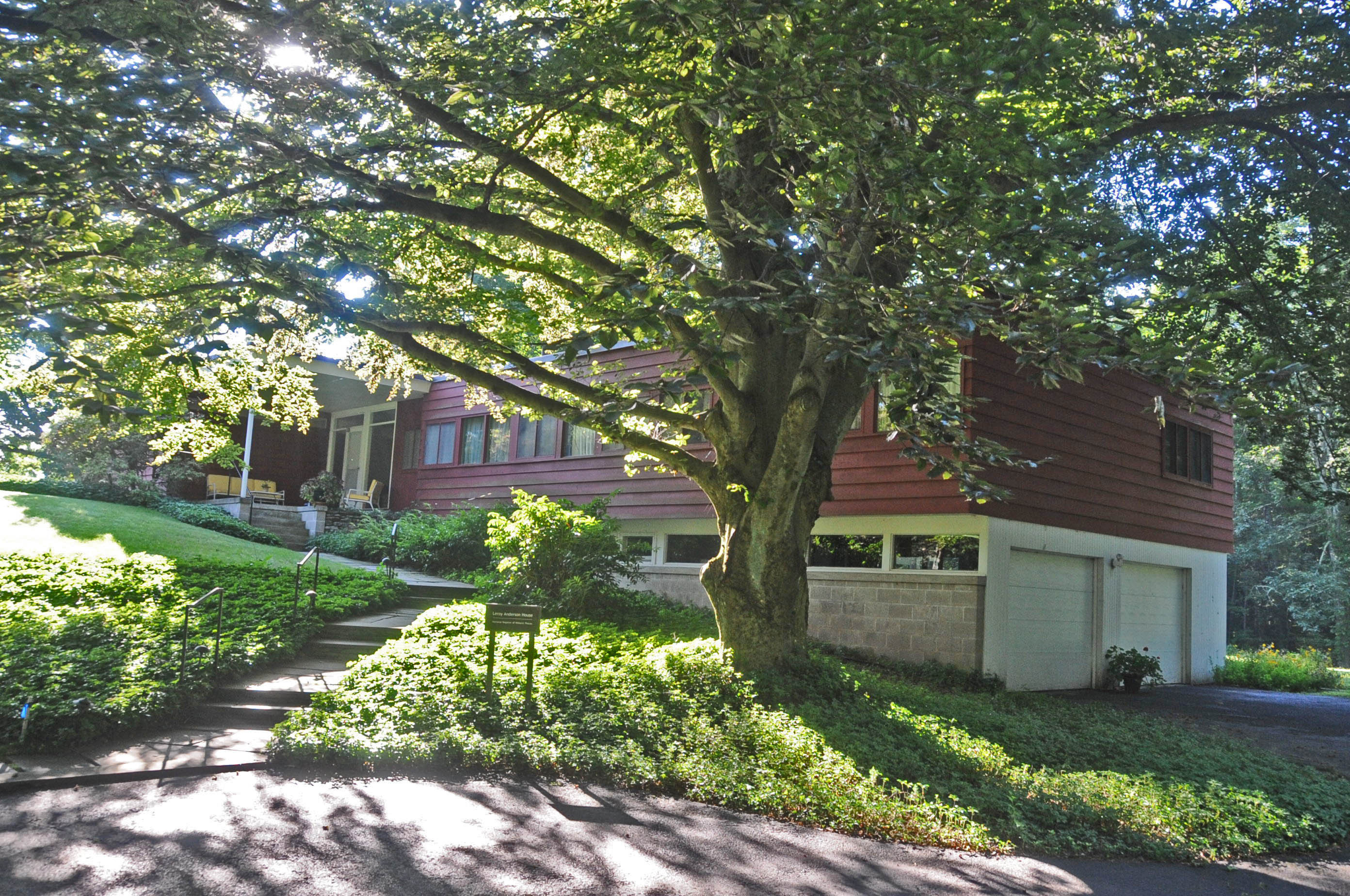

- Location within Connecticut Location within the United States
- Location: 33 Grassy Hill Road, Woodbury, Connecticut
- Coordinates: 41°32′22″N 73°14′8″W
- Area: 27 acres (11 ha)
- Built: 1953
- Architectural style: Mid-Century Modern
- NRHP reference No.: 12000361
- Added to NRHP: December 31, 2012

The Leroy Anderson House is a historic house at 33 Grassy Hill Road in Woodbury, Connecticut. It is a Mid-Century Modern house, built in 1953 for the noted American composer Leroy Anderson and his wife Eleanor. It is now owned by the Leroy Anderson Foundation, and is occasionally opened to the public for tours. It was listed on the National Register of Historic Places in 2012.

== Description and history ==
The Anderson House is located in a rural setting, on 27 acres (11 ha) of land west of Woodbury's village center. It is set on the south side of Grassy Hill Road, just west of its crossing of Good Hill Brook. The property includes a network of walking trails. The house is one story in height, built out of stone and wood, with expansive use of glass. The interior of the house retains some of the Anderson's furnishings, including Leroy Anderon's grand piano.

The house was built in 1953 to a design by Joseph Stein, an architect based in Waterbury. The Andersons had first summered in Woodbury, where Eleanor Anderson grew up, in 1946, where Anderson wrote one of his most famous works, Sleigh Ride, during a summer heat wave. They settled in the town in 1948, and built this house five years later. It was here that they raised four children, and where Anderson composed some of his best-known works. The property has been managed since Anderson's death by a foundation established to propagate his legacy.

== See also ==
- National Register of Historic Places listings in Litchfield County, Connecticut
