= Anderson Fabiano =

Brazilian footballer

Personal information
- Full name: Anderson Carlos Fabiano
- Date of birth: 24 March 1972 (age 54)
- Place of birth: Brazil
- Position: Forward

Senior career*
Years	Team	Apps	(Gls)
1996–1998	Arsenal Tula	42	(18)
1999	Pakhtakor FC	10	(5)
- * Club domestic league appearances and goals

Anderson Carlos Fabiano (born 24 March 1972), is a Brazilian professional forward.

== Club career ==
Fabiano made seven appearances in the Russian First Division for FC Arsenal Tula during 1998.
