= Anderson Mountain =

Summit in Iron County, Missouri

- Location within Missouri

Highest point
- Elevation: 1,467 ft (447 m)
- Coordinates: 37°37′42″N 90°35′58″W

Geography
- Location: Iron County, Missouri, U.S.
- Parent range: Saint Francois Mountains
- Topo map: USGS Iron Mountain Lake

Anderson Mountain is a summit two miles (3.2 km) east of Pilot Knob in Iron County, Missouri, in the United States. The summit has an elevation of 1,467 feet (447 m).

Anderson Mountain has the name of the local Anderson family.
