= Anderson–Clark Farmstead =

- U.S. National Register of Historic Places
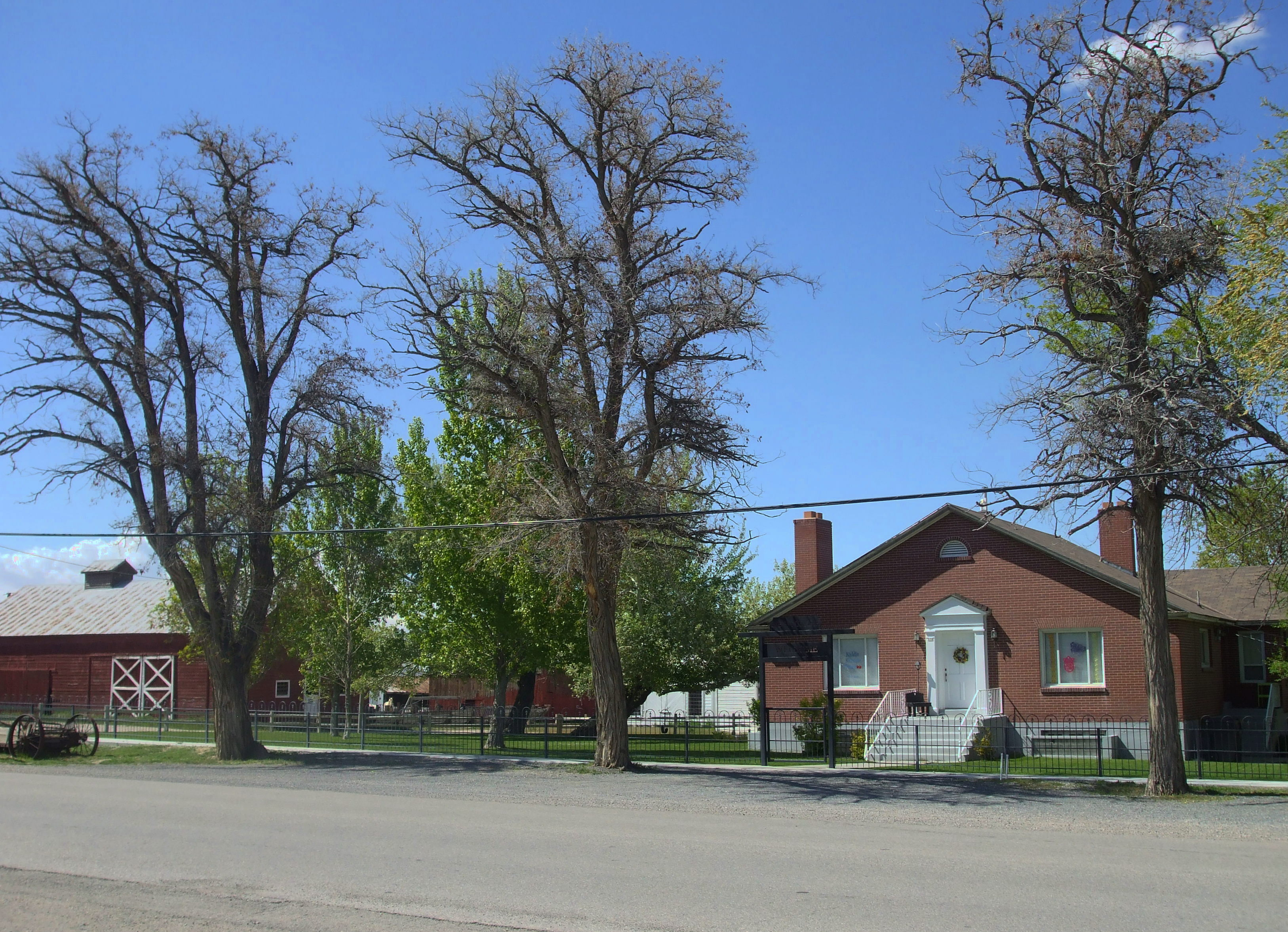
- 2010 photo

- Location within Utah Location within the United States
- Location: 378 W. Clark St., Grantsville, Utah
- Coordinates: 40°36′10″N 112°28′37″W
- Area: 3.2 acres (1.3 ha)
- Built: 1880-1944
- Architectural style: Colonial Revival
- MPS: Grantsville, Utah MPS
- NRHP reference No.: 05001627
- Added to NRHP: February 3, 2006

The Anderson–Clark Farmstead, located at 378 W. Clark St. in Grantsville, Utah, also known as the J. Reuben Clark Farm, was listed on the National Register of Historic Places in 2006. The listing included 13 contributing buildings on 3.2 acres (1.3 ha).

It is historically significant for association with Grantsville's agricultural development, for association with the Anderson and Clark families, and for its "distinctive collection of agricultural outbuildings". The farmhouse was built in 1941; 12 outbuildings were built from 1880 to 1944.

The J. Reuben Clark Historic Farm was first owned by James McBride, founder of Grantsville, Utah. Swedish LDS convert immigrants, Charles L. and Ellen O. Anderson later bought the farm from him in the 1880s. In 1914, J. Reuben Clark, Jr., a Grantsville farm boy who grew up to serve in the administrations of seven U.S. Presidents, as U.S. Ambassador to Mexico, and as long-serving member of the LDS First Presidency, purchased the farm and most people now know it as the “Clark Farm.” The farm is listed on the National Register of Historic Places and anchors the west end of a historic district in the area of the original Grantsville fort.

Charles L. Anderson

As a teenager in 1862, Charles Anderson emigrated with his family from Sweden. His family, who had been well-off in Sweden, arrived in the Salt Lake Valley with nothing, and a Brother Baker from Grantsville met up with them in Salt Lake and took them home with him. They settled in “Swedenberg,” a nickname for the southwest part of Grantsville. When he was 19, Charles drove teams across the Missouri River to bring the Saints to Utah. When he returned to Grantsville in 1866, he married a young Swedish immigrant, Ellen Okelberry. They purchased over 600 acres from James McBride, including the land where the Clark Historic Farm now stands. They built one of the finest farmsteads in town, including a nice two-story adobe home, two large barns, a wagon house, a granary, corrals, shelters and a root cellar between 1890 and 1900.

Charles became one of the wealthiest and most prominent men in Tooele County through his mining interests and through his vast herds of sheep, which he ranged in Wyoming. He was very generous and helped many underprivileged children through school. In 1878, he left his young family to serve for two years on a mission to Sweden. He served two terms as mayor of the town, as a city councilman, Director of the Grantsville Co-op, vice-president of the North Willow Irrigation Company, on the State Board of Education, two terms as a State Representative and twenty years as the First Counselor in the Tooele Stake Presidency,

Ellen's health became frail, and in 1900 they moved to southern California. While living there, Charles died in 1909 and his body was brought back to Grantsville for burial. Ellen sold the farm in 1914 to J. Reuben Clark, Jr. The Anderson's two-story home burned to the ground in 1917.

J. Reuben Clark, Jr.

J. Reuben Clark's father, Joshua R. Clark, came to Utah after serving in the Civil War. He converted to the Mormon faith while living in Ogden, and then moved to Grantsville to teach school. There he met and married Mary Louisa Woolley, who was born in a wagon while her parents were crossing the plains to Utah. Joshua and Mary lived on Samuel Woolley's farm in a stone house about 3 miles northwest of town when J. Reuben Clark, Jr. was born.

As a child, J. Reuben Clark (“Rube”) was expected to help run the family farm, including milking the cow, harvesting the crops and feeding the animals. His mother taught him to read and write, and at the age of 10, Rube finally got the chance to go to formal schooling in the Old Adobe Schoolhouse (now the Donner Reed Museum) and at the Grantsville Academy. He liked school so much that he repeated the 8th grade three times since it was the highest level offered at the time. He was fortunate to be mentored by James E. Talmage who provided a job for him so he could attend the University of Utah, where he graduated as valedictorian. He married Luacine Savage in 1898, and later went to Columbia Law School before beginning his illustrious Washington career. Talmage said Clark was “the greatest mind to ever leave Utah.”

Although his life's work was far from Grantsville, his heart remained in his hometown with his agricultural roots. In 1914, while living in Washington D.C., he purchased the Grantsville farm from Ellen Anderson, and for the next several decades, his brother “Ted” ran the farm. Rube sent his family to Grantsville by train to spend the summers on the farm, but having spent most of their lives in the city, his family was not very fond of the bugs and smells of farm life. Rube, however, never lost his love for the agricultural life. After his calling to the LDS First Presidency, he settled in Salt Lake City, but came often on weekends to renew his spirit with a visit to his farm, particularly after his wife died. In 1941, he built the red brick home that stands there today, and he spent many weekends in his basement office, where he likely wrote some of his famous sermons.

In 1947, the first Tooele County Junior Livestock Show was held at the Clark farm. For many years afterward, youngsters from far and wide brought their animals to be weighed on the Clark Farm's scales. President Clark was known for his numerous prize Herefords and cattle which ranged on his ranch south of Grantsville.

In 1951, President Clark purchased and restored the Old Adobe Schoolhouse with his own resources, then donated it back to the people of Grantsville. When he died in 1961, his farm passed down to his children who later sold it.

The Clark Historic Farm

The barns beautifully display the craftsmanship of early Grantsville settlers, with hand-hewn beams and mortise and tenon construction. Although wooden pegs were used in place of nails throughout the barns, the structures stand plumb and strong after nearly 125 years. Over the years, many people who grew up in Grantsville worked on the Clark Farm changing sprinklers, caring for the animals or harvesting crops.

The farm, which was purchased by Grantsville City in 2005 for a heritage attraction, has recently become a gathering place for community events including Baby Animal Days, Memorial Day breakfast and 5k, Kids’ Historic Farm Camps, community concerts and plays, farmers’ markets, the Utah Honey Harvest Festival and the Live Nativity.

In 2005, a second granary was moved from another Anderson farm to the Clark Farm, and in 2010 many of the sheds and corrals were torn down by new city leaders who hoped to change the land into a cemetery. A citizen group called “Friends of Clark Historic Farm” was established in 2013 to advocate preserving the farm intact, to provide heritage activities and to raise money for restoration. Since May 2013, over 13,000 people have visited the farm, and many interest groups are present at events to bring the community together and to build the local economy.

Representing the agricultural heritage of Grantsville, the Clark Historic Farm symbolizes the rewards of hard work and industry.

== See also ==
- J. Reuben Clark
