= J. Max Anderson House =

United States historic place in Kingman, Arizona

- Max J. Anderson House
- U.S. National Register of Historic Places
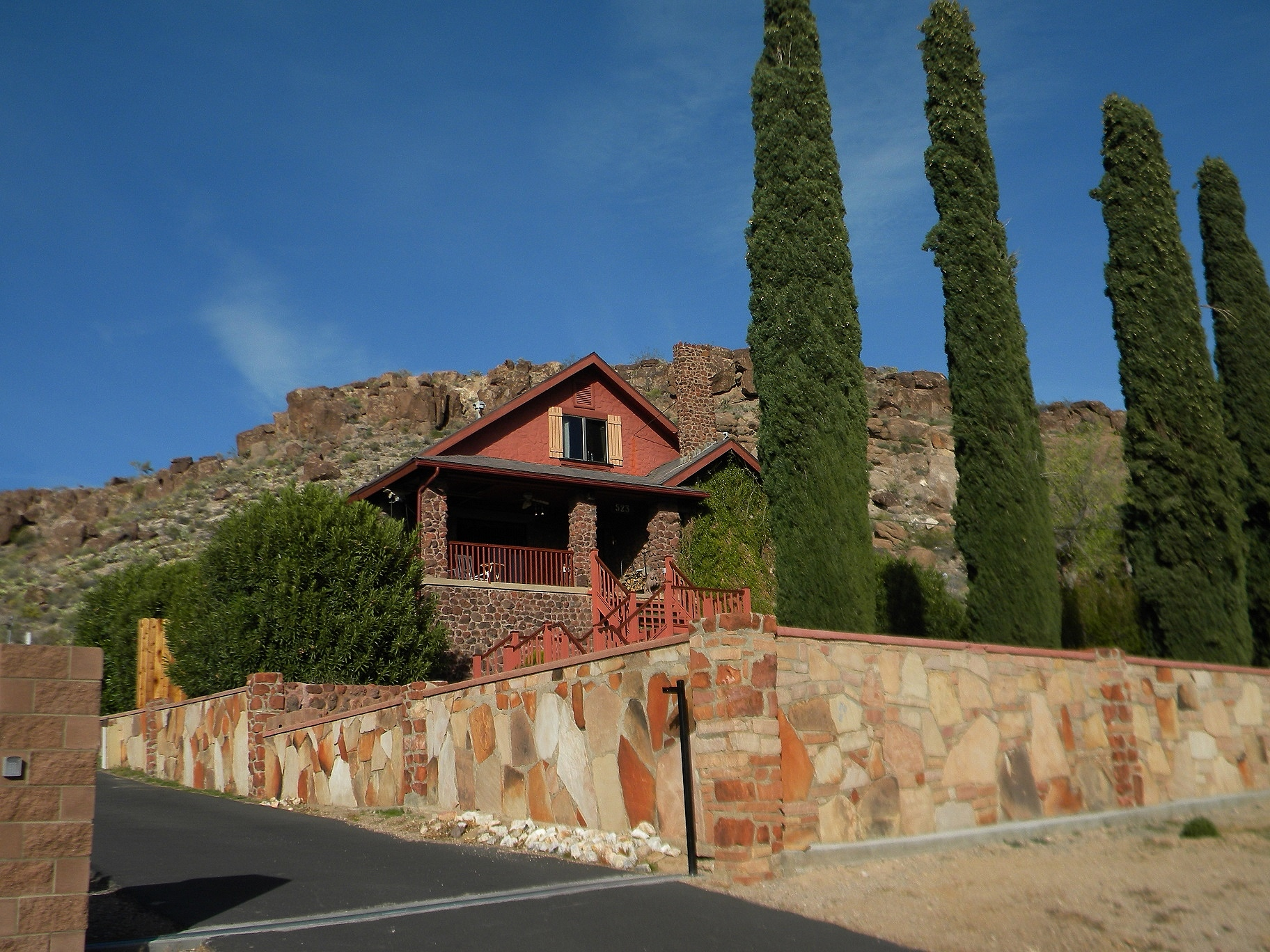

- Location within Arizona Location within the United States
- Location: 523 Pine Street, Kingman, Arizona
- Coordinates: 35°11′25″N 114°3′6″W
- Built: 1927
- Architectural style: Late 19th and 20th Century Revivals
- MPS: Kingman MRA
- NRHP reference No.: 86001110
- Added to NRHP: May 14, 1986

The J. Max Anderson House is part of the Kingman, Arizona Historical District in Kingman, Arizona. It was built in 1927. The house is of the late 19th and 20th Century Revivals styles. It was built with native stone and it is one of six of these of homes in Kingman. This home may have been built for Mary E. Cohenour.

This home is next to the house at 527 Pine Street; most likely both homes were built by the same contractor.

It was evaluated for National Register listing as part of a 1985 study of 63 historic resources in Kingman that led to this and many others being listed in 1986.
