= Anderson Hall =

Anderson Hall may refer to:

== Turkey ==
- Anderson Hall at Boğaziçi University in İstanbul

== United States ==
- Anderson Hall (Gainesville, Florida)
- Anderson Hall (Manhattan, Kansas), administration building of Kansas State University, listed on the NRHP
- Anderson Hall (Lexington, Kentucky)
- Anderson Hall (Philadelphia, Pennsylvania)
- Anderson Hall (West Chester, Pennsylvania)
- Artelia Anderson Hall, Paducah, Kentucky, listed on the NRHP in Kentucky
- Anderson Hall (Maryville College), Tennessee, listed on the NRHP
- L. C. Anderson Hall, Prairie View, Texas, listed on the NRHP in Texas
