= Anderson Manor =

Anderson Manor may refer to:

- Anderson Manor, Dorset, a 1622, Grade I listed, manor house in Dorset, England
- Anderson Manor, Pennsylvania, an 1830, historic house in Pennsylvania, US

== See also ==
- Anderson House (disambiguation)
