= Andresson =

Andresson or Andrésson is a surname. Notable people with the surname include:

- Avdy Andresson (1899–1990), former Estonian Minister of War in exile
- Axel Andrésson (1895–1961), pioneer of Icelandic football, founder of Víkingur FC
- Axel Óskar Andrésson (born 1998), Icelandic professional footballer
- Gunnar Andrésson (born 1970), Icelandic former Olympic handball player
- Hlynur Andrésson (born 1993), Icelandic long-distance runner
- Jökull Andrésson (born 2001), Icelandic professional footballer
- Kristján Andrésson (born 1981), Swedish-born Icelandic retired handball player
- Smiður Andrésson (died 1361), governor in Iceland with reputation for brutal methods in collecting taxes
- Nils Andresson Lavik (1884–1966), Norwegian politician for the Christian Democratic Party

== See also ==
- Anderiesen
- Andersen
- Anderson (disambiguation)
- Andersons (disambiguation)
- Anderssen
- Andersson
- Andreasen
- Andreassen
- Andreasson
- Andreessen (disambiguation)
- Andresen
- Andreson
- Andriessen
