= Andreasen =

Andreasen and the parallel form Andresen (Norwegian cognate Andreassen) are Danish-Norwegian patronymic surnames meaning "son of Andreas". It has a similar origin as the name Andersen. Notable people with the surname include:

- Christian Andreasen (born 1988), Danish footballer
- Dagmar Andreasen (1920–2006), Danish businesswoman and politician
- Emil Andreasen (1895–1972), Danish boxer
- George Andreasen (1934–1989), American orthodontist
- Heidi Andreasen (born 1985), Faroese paralympic swimming silver medalist
- Jakob Andreasen (handball coach) (born 1976), Danish handball coach
- Lawrence Andreasen (1945–1990), American athlete
- Leon Andreasen (born 1983), Danish footballer
- Marta Andreasen (born 1954), Argentina-born member of the European Parliament
- Nancy Coover Andreasen (born 1938), American neuroscientist
- Rannvá Andreasen (born 1980), Faroese association footballer
- Søren Andreasen (born 1996), Danish footballer

== See also ==
- Andresen
- Andersen
- Andreessen (disambiguation)
- Andriessen
- Andreassen
- Andreasson
