= 1966 in aviation =

This is a list of aviation-related events from 1966.

== Events ==
=== January ===
- The United States Army′s helicopter assault-oriented 1st Cavalry Division (Airmobile) begins Operation Matador to destroy North Vietnamese Army forces in Pleiku and Kon Tum Province, South Vietnam.
- January 1 – The U.S. Military Air Transport Service is redesignated the Military Airlift Command.
- January 1–7 – The U.S. Army's 173rd Airborne Brigade and Australian troops carry out Operation Marauder, a combined helicopter and ground assault against Viet Cong forces in South Vietnam's Mekong Delta and the first time American units operate in the Delta.
- January 3 – The United States Air Force′s second North American XB-70A Valkyrie – named Air Vehicle 2 (AV-2) – reaches Mach 3.05 at an altitude of 72,000 feet (22,000 meters).
- January 4 – Avianca Flight 4, a Douglas C-54 Skymaster, crashes into the Caribbean Sea just after takeoff from Cartagena-Crespo Airport in Cartagena, Colombia, killing 56 of the 64 people on board.
- January 6 – A U.S. Air Force XB-70A Valkyrie remains in the air continuously for 3 hours 40 minutes, the longest flight ever by an XB-70.
- January 8–14 – In Operation Crimp, a U.S. Army 173rd Airborne Brigade helicopter and ground assault destroys a Viet Cong headquarters in the Ho Bo Woods in South Vietnam.
- January 12 – A U.S. Air Force XB-70A Valkyrie reaches 2,020 mph (3,250 km/h), the highest speed ever reached by an XB-70.
- January 17 – A U.S. Air Force B-52 Stratofortress collides with a KC-135 Stratotanker during aerial refueling near Palomares, Spain. Both aircraft crash, killing the entire four-man crew of the KC-135 and three of the seven men aboard the B-52. Two of the B-52's nuclear bombs rupture, scattering radioactive material over the Spanish countryside. One bomb lands intact near Palomares, and another is lost in the Mediterranean Sea. It is later recovered intact 5 miles (8.0 km) offshore.
- January 22 – The U.S. Air Force completes Operation Blue Light, the largest airlift of troops and equipment into a combat zone in history. Since the operation began on December 27, 1965, the Air Force has flown 4,600 short tons (4,173 metric tons) of equipment and over 3,000 troops from Hickam Air Force Base, Hawaii, to Pleiku, South Vietnam.
- January 24
  - Operation Masher, later renamed Operation White Wing, a helicopter and ground assault by the U.S. Army's 1st Cavalry Division (Airmobile) and South Vietnamese Army and South Korean Army units, begins against North Vietnamese Army forces in Binh Dinh Province, South Vietnam. The operation concludes on March 6.
  - The Boeing 707-437 Kanchenjunga, operating as Air India Flight 101, crashes on Mont Blanc in France, killing all 117 people on board; Indian nuclear physicist Homi J. Bhabha, the father of India's nuclear program, is among the dead. In 1950, Air India Flight 245 had crashed in almost exactly the same spot.
- January 28 – Lufthansa Flight 005, a Convair CV-440 Metropolitan, aborts its landing in heavy rain at Bremen Airport in Bremen, West Germany, then crashes doing a subsequent go around maneuver, killing all 46 people on board. Among the dead are actress Ada Chekhova, daughter of Olga Chekhova and mother of Vera Tschechowa, and seven swimmers of the Italian Olympic Team and their coach.
- January 31 – The United States resumes Operation Rolling Thunder over North Vietnam.

=== February ===
- In the 1966 Defence White Paper, the British Labour government announces that the Royal Navy′s planned CVA-01 aircraft carrier will not be built because of its expense. It also declares that the traditional strike, reconnaissance, air defense, and airborne early warning functions of carrier-based aircraft can be carried out more cheaply by shore-based Royal Air Force aircraft, that the use of cruiser- and frigate-based helicopters would be a cheaper means of providing anti-submarine defense of ships, and that ship-launched anti-ship missiles could replace carrier planes in the anti-ship role.
- February 2
  - Nicholas Piantanida launches from Joe Foss Field in Sioux Falls, South Dakota, in the balloon Strato Jump II, hoping to set a new world record for the highest parachute jump. He is forced to give up the attempt when he is unable to disconnect his oxygen system, and he detaches the balloon's gondola and parachutes safely to earth inside it. The flight sets an unofficial world balloon altitude record of 123,500 feet (37,642 meters (23.390 miles), although the Fédération Aéronautique Internationale does not recognize it as official because he returns to earth in the gondola without remaining attached to the balloon. The record will stand until Felix Baumgartner's balloon flight on 14 October 2012.
  - Pakistan International Airlines Flight 17, a Sikorsky S-61, experiences an oil leak, strikes a vulture, and then loses power and crashes near Faridpur, East Pakistan (now in Bangladesh), killing 23 of the 24 people on board and injuring the lone survivor.
- February 4 – All Nippon Airways Flight 60 crashes into Tokyo Bay while on night approach to Tokyo's Haneda International Airport, killing all 133 people on board. It is the worst death toll in a single-aircraft accident in history at the time, and will remain so until 1969.
- February 8 – Freddie Laker founds Laker Airways
- February 17 – Aeroflot Flight 65, a Tupolev Tu-114, crashes on takeoff in deteriorating weather at Sheremetyevo International Airport in Moscow, killing 21 and injuring at least 18, after its crew attempts to take off without realizing that snow has not been fully cleared from the runway and its wing strikes a sowban during its takeoff roll, forcing two of its propellers to strike the runway, after which it veers off the runway and catches fire. It is the only fatal crash involving the long-range turboprop Tu-114.
- February 28 – A National Aeronautics and Space Administration T-38 Talon crashes at Lambert Field in St. Louis, Missouri, killing astronauts Elliot See and Charles Bassett, the prime crew for Gemini 9, scheduled to launch in early June.

=== March ===
- United States Navy A-4 Skyhawk bombers become the first aircraft to use the AGM-45 Shrike anti-radiation missile in combat, targeting guidance radars at surface-to-air missile sites in North Vietnam.
- United States Marine Corps Marine Medium Helicopter Squadron 164 (HMM-164) arrives in South Vietnam with 27 Boeing Vertol CH-46A Sea Knights, becoming the first unit to make a combat deployment with the CH-46.
- March 4 – Canadian Pacific Airlines Flight 402, a Douglas DC-8, strikes the approach lights and a seawall during a night landing attempt in poor visibility at Tokyo International Airport in Japan and crashes on the runway, killing 64 of the 72 people on board.
- March 5
  - After taxiing past the wreckage of Canadian Pacific Airlines Flight 402 at Tokyo International Airport, Boeing 707-436 G-APFE, operating as BOAC Flight 911, disintegrates in severe clear-air turbulence and crashes near Mount Fuji in Japan shortly after take-off, killing all 124 people on board. The two crashes kill a combined 188 people, a record total at the time for aviation accidents in a 24-hour period.
  - For the first time, the United States employs the Alpha section (listing major fixed ground targets in North Vietnam) of a U.S. Joint Chiefs of Staff Rolling Thunder order.
- March 7 – France withdraws from the military structure of the North Atlantic Treaty Organization, although it remains a political member of the alliance.
- March 10 – In order to rescue a downed U.S. Air Force A-1E Skyraider pilot, U.S. Air Force Major Bernard F. Fisher of the 1st Air Commando Squadron lands his own A-1E on an airstrip in South Vietnam's A Shau Valley after the airstrip had been overrun by North Vietnamese troops. Fisher later receives the Medal of Honor for this action.
- March 18 – United Arab Airlines Flight 749, an Antonov An-24 (registration SU-AOA), crashes about five kilometers (3.1 miles) short of the runway while attempting to land at Cairo International Airport in Cairo, Egypt, killing all 30 people on board.
- March 19 – A United States Air Force North American XB-70A Valkyrie reaches 74,000 feet (23,000 meters), the greatest altitude ever achieved by an XB-70.
- March 27 – The flight engineer aboard a Cubana de Aviación Ilyushin Il-18B (registration CU-T831) shoots and kills the on-board security guard during a domestic flight in Cuba from Santiago de Cuba to Havana and hijacks the plane, demanding to be flown to Florida. The captain pretends to be flying to Florida but actually lands the airliner at José Martí International Airport in Havana. Seeing an Aeroflot airliner on the tarmac and realizing that captain had tricked him, the flight engineer shoots the captain dead and tries to initiate a takeoff, but the copilot shuts the engines down. The flight engineer jumps out of the plane and flees; he will be apprehended several days later.
- March 31 – The U.S. Air Force's Strategic Air Command retires its last B-47 Stratojet. The first all-jet strategic bomber, the B-47 had served since 1951.

=== April ===
- The U.S. Navy moves Yankee Station northward in the Gulf of Tonkin.
- Pan American World Airways signs a contract with the Boeing Company for the construction of 25 Boeing 747 airliners. It is the world's first order for wide-body airliners.
- Tunisair inaugurates service between Tunis, Tunisia, and Frankfurt-am-Main, West Germany. It had last offered service on the route between October 1961 and March 1962.
- April 12
  - U.S. Air Force B-52 Stratofortresses strike targets in North Vietnam for the first time.
  - The U.S. Air Force's second North American XB-70A Valkyrie – named Air Vehicle 2 (AV-2) – reaches a maximum speed of Mach 3.08 and maintains it for 20 minutes. It is the highest Mach number ever reached by an XB-70.
- April 13 – President of Iraq Abdul Salam Arif dies in the crash of a Royal Iraqi Air Force de Havilland DH.104 Dove 1 in southern Iraq.
- April 19 – U.S. Navy aircraft strike the coal port of Cam Pha, North Vietnam, only 35 miles (56 km) from North Vietnam's border with the People's Republic of China.
- April 22 – American Flyers Flight 280, transporting Army recruits who had just completed basic training from Ford Ord, California to Fort Benning, Georgia crashed on approach to Ardmore Municipal Airport, Oklahoma . Eighty-three of the 98 passengers and crew on board died as a result of the accident.
- April 23 – American aircraft encounter MiG fighters in large numbers over North Vietnam.

=== May ===
- Mikoyan-Gurevich MiG-21s start to appear in the skies over Vietnam.
- May 1
  - While ascending in the balloon Strato Jump III to attempt to set a new world skydiving altitude record of over 120,000 feet (37,000 meters), Nicholas Piantanida is fatally injured when his pressure suit depressurizes at an altitude of about 57,000 feet (17,000 meters). Although ground controllers detach the gondola from the balloon at an altitude of 56,000 feet (17,000 meters) and return it to earth in a 25-minute parachute descent with Piantanida on board, Piantanida suffers brain damage and never emerges from a coma. He will die on August 29.
  - Jamaica Air Service Ltd. inaugurates service from Jamaica to Miami, Florida, and New York City.
- May 19 – The United States Air Force′s second North American XB-70A Valkyrie – named Air Vehicle 2 (AV-2) – covers 2,400 miles in 91 minutes of flight, flying at Mach 3 for 32 minutes – the longest continuous time at Mach 3 ever achieved by an XB-70 – and reaching a maximum speed of Mach 3.06.
- May 23–26 – A new Learjet 24 makes a round-the-world demonstration flight to exhibit its capabilities. The total flight time for the trip is 50 hours and 20 minutes.

=== June ===
- The Indian Air Force begins re-arming to replace losses from the previous year's war with Pakistan.
- The U.S. Army begins testing the Remote Image Intensifier System, a low-light-level television system on UH-1C attack helicopters known as "Batships" in the Mekong Delta of South Vietnam, hoping to improve night capabilities against Viet Cong forces. The test will conclude in November with the system found to be unreliable.
- June 1 – Alisarda begins scheduled service.
- June 3 – A Hawker Siddeley Trident 1C on its first test flight crashes at Felthorpe, Norfolk, England, killing the entire four-man crew.
- June 6 – Outfitted with test sensors, the United States Air Force′s second North American XB-70A Valkyrie – named Air Vehicle 2 (AV-2) – conducts a sonic boom test, reaching Mach 3.05 at an altitude of 72,000 feet (22,000 meters).
- June 7 – Robert and Joan Wallick set a round-the-world flight record.
- June 8 – During a publicity photo shoot of aircraft powered by General Electric engines in which the U.S. Air Force's second XB-70A research aircraft – named Air Vehicle 2 (AV-2) – flies in formation with an F-4 Phantom II, an F-5 Freedom Fighter, an F-104 Starfighter, and a T-38 Talon at an altitude of about 25,000 feet (7,600 meters), the F-104 collides with the XB-70A. The F-104 explodes, killing its pilot, National Aeronautics and Space Administration (NASA) chief test pilot Joseph A. Walker. The XB-70A crashes and is destroyed. The XB-70A's copilot is killed, while its pilot, Alvin S. White ejects and suffers serious injuries. The crash leaves only one XB-70A – Air Vehicle 1 (AV-1) – in existence.
- June 12 – Escorting A-4 Skyhawks from the attack aircraft carrier USS Hancock (CVA-19) during a bombing raid northwest of Haiphong, North Vietnam, U.S. Navy Commander Harold L. Marr of Fighter Squadron 211 (VF-211) scores the first kill by an F-8 Crusader, shooting down a North Vietnamese MiG-17 (NATO reporting name "Fresco") with an AIM-9 Sidewinder air-to-air missile.
- June 20 – Sheila Scott completes a solo round-the-world flight.
- June 29
  - The U.S. Air Force bombs Hanoi for the first time.
  - For the first time, President Lyndon B. Johnson's administration authorizes attacks on industrial targets in northeastern North Vietnam and on North Vietnam's entire petroleum, oil, and lubricants system.

=== July ===
- July 1 – U.S. Navy aircraft from the aircraft carriers USS Constellation (CVA-64) and USS Hancock (CVA-19) sink three North Vietnamese torpedo boats.
- July 7 – The pilot and eight other people aboard a Cubana de Aviación Ilyushin Il-18 hijack the plane during a domestic flight in Cuba from Santiago de Cuba to Havana and fly it to Jamaica.
- July 14 – In response to Fatah commando attacks launched from inside Syria, Israeli Air Force jets strike Syrian tractors and mechanical equipment in the Golan Heights southeast of Almagor, Israel. The equipment had been engaged in diverting the flow of water from the Baniyas springs away from the Jordan River.
- July 24 – American professional golfer Tony Lema dies in the crash of a Beechcraft Bonanza on approach to Lansing Municipal Airport in Lansing, Illinois; the plane crashes into a water hazard short of the seventh green on the golf course at Lansing Country Club, less than a mile (1.6 km) from the airport. The other three people on the plane – the pilot, the co-pilot, and Lema's wife – also are killed.

=== August ===
- Three hijackers commandeer an Aeroflot airliner in the Soviet Union. Security forces storm the plane while it is on the ground at Batumi and arrest the hijackers.
- August 1–25 – The U.S. Army's 1st Cavalry Division (Airmobile) conducts Operation Paul Revere II, a helicopter and ground assault against enemy forces in the Pleiku area of South Vietnam.
- August 3 – With enough land-based aircraft now available to support forces in the area, the U.S. Navy ends aircraft carrier deployments to Dixie Station off South Vietnam.
- August 5 – The Soviet Union protests damage to one of its merchant ships in a North Vietnamese port due to American air attacks.
- August 6 – Braniff Flight 250, a BAC 1-11-203AE, encounters severe turbulence when it enters an active squall line and crashes near Falls City, Nebraska, after losing its right wing, right stabilizer, and tailfin. All 42 people on board die.
- August 15 – Syrian forces open fire on an Israeli patrol boat that has run aground on the shore of the Sea of Galilee, leading to combat between the Israeli and Syrian air forces. Israel claims two Syrian jets shot down.
- August 28 – The Soviet Union announces that it is training North Vietnamese Air Force pilots.

=== September ===
- September 9 – The Concorde's Rolls-Royce Olympus engine begins flight tests underneath an Avro Vulcan bomber.
- September 19 – Using UH-1Bs borrowed from the U.S. Army, the U.S. Navy's first attack helicopter unit begins operations, supporting U.S. Navy riverine forces operating in South Vietnam's Mekong Delta.
- September 22 – Ansett-ANA Flight 149, a Vickers Viscount Type 832, experiences an in-flight engine fire which spreads to the left wing, causing much of the wing to break off. The plane crashes near Winton, Queensland, Australia, killing all 24 people on board.
- September 24 – Marina Solovyeva sets a new women's airspeed record of 2,044 km/h (1,270 mph) in the Mikoyan-Gurevich Ye-76.
- September 28
  - A wheel-well stowaway inside a Colombian jet airliner survives a flight from Bogotá to Mexico City at an altitude of 34,000 feet (10,000 meters).
  - Nineteen Argentinians hijack an Aerolineas Argentinas Douglas DC-4 (registration LV-AGG) with 38 people on board during a domestic flight in Argentina from Buenos Aires to Río Gallegos and force it to fly to the Falkland Islands to stage a symbolic invasion of the islands, which Argentina claims as its territory and calls the Malvinas. The airliner lands on Port Stanley Racecourse in Port Stanley on East Falkland, its right landing gear sinking into a peat bog at the end of its landing roll.
- September 30 – Frontier Airlines inaugurates jet service, using Boeing 727-100s.

=== October ===
- The U.S. Army's 1st Cavalry Division (Airmobile) joins the U.S. 4th and 25th Infantry Divisions in Operation Paul Revere IV, a helicopter and ground assault against enemy forces in the area around Pleiku, South Vietnam.
- Operation Attleboro begins, the largest combat operations for American ground forces thus far in the Vietnam War. The U.S. Army's airmobile 173rd Airborne Brigade participates. Heavy fighting against North Vietnamese Army forces will ensue until November 24.
- October 1 – West Coast Airlines Flight 956, a Douglas DC-9-14, crashes near Wemme, Oregon, killing all 18 people on board.
- October 15 – An act of Congress creates the United States Department of Transportation. When it begins operations on 1 April 1967, the Federal Aviation Agency and Civil Aeronautics Board are to become components of it.

=== November ===
- The American military command in Vietnam establishes control of all air operations throughout Indochina.
- U.S. Navy attack helicopters in South Vietnam begin using flight-deck-equipped tank landing ships operating in the Mekong Delta as bases.
- November 1 – Air Canada begins the first North American air services to the Soviet Union.
- November 11 – A U.S. Air Force 551st Airborne Early Warning and Control Wing EC-121H Warning Star crashes in the Atlantic Ocean off Nantucket, Massachusetts, killing the entire 19-man crew.
- November 13
  - All Nippon Airways Flight 533, a NAMC YS-11, crashes into the Seto Inland Sea off Matsuyama Airport, killing all 50 people on board.
  - Four Royal Jordanian Air Force Hawker Hunter aircraft attack an Israeli Army unit engaged in blowing up buildings in as-Samu, Jordan, that Fatah has used for staging commando attacks into Israel. Israeli Air Force aircraft respond, shoot down one Hunter, and drive off the other three. One Israeli pilot loses an eye during the dogfight.
- November 14 – A U.S. Air Force 86th Military Airlift Squadron C-141 Starlifter piloted by Captain Howard Geddes becomes the first jet aircraft to land in Antarctica, touching down on the ice at McMurdo Sound after a 2,200-mile (3,543-km) flight from Christchurch, New Zealand.
- November 15 – The Pan American World Airways Boeing 727-21 cargo aircraft Clipper München, operating as Flight 708, crashes during initial approach to Tegel Airport in West Berlin, killing all three crew members.
- November 18 – Captain William J. Knight flies the North American X-15 to a record speed of Mach 6.33 (4,250 mph (6,840 km/h).
- November 24 – TABSO Flight 101, an Ilyushin Il-18B, crashes in the foothills of the Little Carpathians two minutes after takeoff from Bratislava Airport in Bratislava, Czechoslovakia, killing all 82 people on board. Among the dead are the Honduran writer and journalist Ramón Amaya Amador and flight attendant Svetla Georgieva, who 18 days earlier had married the Bulgarian sports official Ivan Slavkov. It remains the deadliest aviation accident in the history of Slovakia.

=== December ===
- U.S. Navy aircraft conduct their first strikes near Hanoi.
- December 6 – The West German Air Force grounds its fleet of Lockheed F-104 Starfighters to investigate continuing accidents with the type.
- December 21 – The first launch of the United States Air Force's Martin X-23 PRIME (Precision Reentry Including Maneuvering reEntry) experimental lifting body re-entry vehicle – designed to maneuver during reentry of Earth's atmosphere and be recovered in midair by a specially-equipped Lockheed JC-130B Hercules aircraft – takes place atop an Atlas SLV-3 launch vehicle at Vandenberg Air Force Base, California. The mission simulates a low Earth orbit reentry with no cross-range maneuvers off the vehicle's ballistic track. The X-23's drogue ballute deploys at an altitude of 99,850 feet (30,430 meters), but its recovery parachute fails to deploy completely, and the vehicle crashes into the Pacific Ocean.
- December 25–26 – The United States conducts a 48-hour standdown of air operations over Vietnam for the Christmas holiday.

== First flights ==
=== January ===
- January 10 – Bell Model 206 JetRanger
- January 24 – Learjet 24
- January 27 – Fairchild FH-227

=== February ===
- Antonov An-12 "Cub" (civil version) with Aeroflot
- February 23 – Dornier Do 28D Skyservant D-INTL
- February 25 – Alon A-4
- February 26 – Nihon NM-63 Linnet I

=== March ===
- March 5 – Lockheed D-21 Drone
- March 17 – Bell X-22
- March 18 – Wassmer WA-50

=== April ===
- April 12 – Pilatus PC-7
- April 29 – Neiva Universal (PP-ZTW)

=== May ===
- May 21 – Davis DA-2
- May 26 – Filper Research Beta

=== June ===
- June 12 – Dassault Mirage F2
- June 22 – Dassault Mirage IIIV second prototype, experimental VTOL fighter design

=== July ===
- Beechcraft Model 99
- July 1 – Andreasson BA-4B
- July 12 – Northrop M2-F2
- July 21 – Kawasaki P-2J

=== August ===
- August 2 – Sukhoi Su-7IG, prototype of the Sukhoi Su-17 (NATO reporting name "Fitter-C")
- August 12 – Learjet 25
- August 31 – Hawker Siddeley Harrier

=== October ===
- October 2 – Grumman Gulfstream II
- October 16 – "Caspian Sea Monster"
- October 21 – Yakovlev Yak-40

=== November ===
- November 7 – Pilatus PC-11
- November 10 – DINFIA IA 53

=== December ===
- December 6 – ChangKong-1
- December 21 – X-23 PRIME
- December 22 – Northrop HL-10
- December 23 – Dassault Mirage F1
- December 27 – Aeritalia G91Y
- December 29 – Beechcraft Duke

== Entered service ==
- Fairchild Hiller FH-1100
- Early 1966 – Beechcraft King Air Model A90

=== January ===
- January 7 – SR-71 Blackbird with the US Air Force
- January 20 – Short Belfast with No. 53 Squadron RAF

=== July ===
- Vickers VC10 with No. 10 Squadron RAF
- July 1 – Fairchild FH-227 with Mohawk Airlines

=== September ===
- Hawker Siddeley Andover with No. 46 Squadron RAF

== Retired from service ==
- March 31 – Boeing B-47 Stratojet by the United States Air Force Strategic Air Command
- August 16 – NASA M2-F1 by the National Aeronautics and Space Administration Flight Research Center

== Deadliest crash ==
The deadliest crash of this year was All Nippon Airways Flight 60, a Boeing 727 which crashed into Tokyo Bay, Japan on 4 February, as it approached Haneda Airport, killing all 133 people on board; as well as being then the world's deadliest single-aircraft accident, it was also among a string of five major crashes to strike Japan in 1966; 371 people were killed in these incidents.
