= Andersen =

Andersen (Danish pronunciation: [ˈɑnɐsn̩]) is a Danish-Norwegian patronymic surname meaning "son of Anders" (itself derived from the Greek name "Ανδρέας/Andreas", cf. English Andrew). It is the fifth most common surname in Denmark, shared by about 3.2% of the population.

From the same root – the given name Andreas – derives the surname Andreasen Danish pronunciation: [ænˈtʁeˀæsn̩] (cognate Andreassen) and Andresen Danish pronunciation: [ænˈtʁeˀsn̩].

The numbers of bearers of the surnames Andersen, Andreasen, Andreassen and Andresen in Denmark and Norway (2009):

| | Andersen | Andreasen | Andreassen | Andresen | Source |
|---|---|---|---|---|---|
| Denmark | 165,871 | 12,013 | 2,430 | 4,508 | Statistics Denmark |
| Norway | 38,433 | 103 | 12,376 | 6,581 | Statistics Norway |

== Persons ==
- Adda Husted Andersen (1898–1990), Danish-born American Modernist jeweler, silversmith, metalsmith, and educator
- Aksel Andersen (1912–1977), American-Danish organist and composer
- Aksel Frederik Andersen (1891–1972), Danish mathematician
- Alex Høgh Andersen (born 1994), Danish actor
- Alf Andersen (ski jumper) (1906–1975), Norwegian ski jumper
- Alf Andersen (musician), Norwegian flautist
- Alsing Emanuel Andersen (1893–1962), Danish politician
- Amalie Andersen (born 1999), Danish ice hockey player
- Amalie Andersen (actress) (1861–1924), Norwegian actress
- Anders Ejnar Andersen (1912–2006), Danish politician
- André Andersen (born 1961), Russian-Danish multi-instrumentalist and composer
- Anja Andersen (born 1969), Danish handball coach and former handball player.
- Arthur E. Andersen (1885–1947), founder of the eponymous former auditing, tax and consulting firm
- Asbjørn Andersen (disambiguation), several people
- Benny Andersen (1929–2018), Danish composer
- Bjørg Andersen (born 1942), Norwegian handball player
- Birgit Fogh-Andersen (1922–2012), Danish politician
- Børge Kaas Andersen (1937–2019), Danish rower
- Børge Andersen (chess player) (1934–1993), Danish chess player
- Bridgette Andersen (1975–1997), American child actress
- Britta Andersen (born 1979), Danish badminton player
- Carl Albert Andersen (1876–1951), Norwegian pole vaulter
- Chris Andersen (born 1978), American basketball player
- Daniel Andersen (1885–1959), Danish composer
- David Andersen (born 1980), Australian basketball player
- Derek Andersen, American DJ
- Dorothy Hansine Andersen (1901–1963) American physician, pediatrician, pathologist, identifier of cystic fibrosis
- Elisabeth Andersen (1920–2018), stage name for the Dutch actress Anna Elisabeth de Bruijn
- Ellen Andersen (1898–1989), Danish museum curator
- Else Winther Andersen (born 1941), Danish politician
- Eric Andersen (born 1943), American singer-songwriter
- Eric Andersen (artist) (born 1940), Danish artist
- Erik Andersen (disambiguation), several people
- Eyvin Andersen (1914–1968), Danish composer
- Filip Andersen (born 2003), Mongolian-Danish football player known as Filip Chinzorig
- Finn Andersen (born 1990), Danish Counter-Strike player known as karrigan
- Francis Andersen (1925–2020), Australian scholar of Biblical Hebrew
- Frederik Andersen (born 1989), Danish ice hockey goaltender
- Fritz Andersen (1829–1910), Danish composer
- Ginny Andersen, New Zealand politician
- Greta Andersen (1927–2023), Danish-American swimmer
- Hakon Andersen (1875–1959), Danish composer
- Hans Christian Andersen (1805–1875), Danish playwright and author
- Hans Niels Andersen (1852–1937), Danish shipping magnate, businessman and founder of the East Asiatic Company
- Hjalmar Andersen (1923–2013), Norwegian speed skater
- James Roy Andersen (1904–1945), A United States Army Air Forces General
- Jette Andersen (runner) (born 1945), Danish international athlete
- Joachim Andersen (composer) (1847–1909), Danish flautist, conductor and composer
- Joachim Andersen (footballer) (born 1996) Danish footballer
- Johanne Andersen (women's rights activist) (1862–1925), Danish women's rights activists
- Johannes Andersen (musician) (1890–1980), Danish composer
- Kai Normann Andersen (1900–1967), Danish composer
- Kenneth Andersen, Norwegian player of American football and a member of the Eidsvoll 1814s
- Kate Andersen (1870–1957), New Zealand teacher, community leader and writer
- Kim Andersen (cyclist) (born 1958), Danish former professional road bicycle racer and current cycling team directeur sportif
- Kirsti Andersen (born 1941), historian
- Knud Andersen (disambiguation), several people
- LaDell Andersen (1929–2019), American basketball coach
- Lucas Andersen (born 1994), Danish footballer
- Mads Andersen (born 1995), Danish chess grandmaster
- Mark Andersen, American community activist
- Matt Andersen, Canadian musician
- May Andersen (born 1982), Danish model
- Mette Andersen (born 1974), Danish cyclist
- Mette Marie Andersen (born 1962), birth name of Saliha Marie Fetteh, Danish writer, lecturer and imam
- Michael Andersen (born 1974), Danish basketball player
- Mikkel Andersen (disambiguation)
- Morten Andersen (born 1960), Danish American football player
- Neil L. Andersen (born 1951), member of the Quorum of the Twelve Apostles in the LDS Church
- Rigmor Andersen (1903–1995), Danish designer, educator, and author
- Ron Andersen (1941–1997), American bridge player
- Roy Andersen (born 1955), Norwegian long-distance runner
- Roy Andersen (general) (born 1948), South African businessman and retired general
- Sarah Andersen, American cartoonist (Sarah's Scribbles)
- Sophus Andersen (1859–1923), Danish composer
- Stell Andersen, (1897–1989), American pianist
- Stephan Andersen (born 1981), Danish football goalkeeper
- Stephen O. Andersen (born 1948), scientist
- Theresa Berg Andersen (born 1979), Danish politician
- Thomas Herman Andersen (1894–1975), Western Australian police commissioner
- Tom Andersen, American politician
- Torben Andersen, American economist
- Troy Andersen (born 1999), American football player
- Uell Stanley Andersen (1917–1986), American writer
- Vilhelm Andersen (1864–1953), Danish author
- Walter K. Andersen, American scholar

== Fictional characters ==
- Jesse Anderson (Yu-Gi-Oh! GX), also named Johan Andersen, from the anime Yu-Gi-Oh! GX
- Riley Andersen, from the Pixar film Inside Out and its sequel

== See also ==
- Anderson (surname)
- Andersson (surname)
- Andresen
