= Andreasson =

Andreasson is a surname. Notable people with the surname include:

- Egon Andreasson (1910–1983), Swedish politician
- Knut Olaf Andreasson Strand (1887–1980), Norwegian politician for the Liberal Party
- Marcus Andreasson (born 1978), Swedish footballer
- Martin Andreasson, born 1970, is a Swedish Liberal People's Party politician, member of the Riksdag 2002–2006
- Mattias Andréasson (born 1981), Swedish singer and Swedish Idol 2007 contestant
- Pontus Andreasson (born 1998), Swedish ice hockey player
- Rikard Andreasson (born 1979), Swedish cross country skier who has competed since 2000
- Rune Andréasson (1925–1999), Swedish comic creator
- Veronica Andrèasson (born 1981), Swedish road cyclist

== See also ==
- Andreasson BA-11, acrobatic biplane designed for homebuilding
- Andreasson BA-4B, single-seat aerobatic biplane marketed for homebuilding
- Andreassen
- Andreessen (disambiguation)
- Andriessen
- Andresen
- Andersen
