= Johannes Andersen =

Johannes Andersen may refer to:

- Johannes Andersen (athlete) (1888–1967), Norwegian athlete
- Johannes Andersen (musician) (1890–1980), Danish musician
- Johannes Carl Andersen (1873–1962), New Zealand clerk, poet, librarian, ethnologist and historian
- Johannes S. Andersen (1898–1970), Norwegian resistance fighter during World War II

== See also ==
- Johannes S. Anderson (1887–1950), Finland born U.S. Army soldier and Medal of Honor recipient
