= Andreson =

Andreson is a surname. Notable people with the surname include:

- Cornelius Andreson (fl. 1674–1675), Dutch pirate, privateer, and soldier
- Laura Andreson (1902–1999), American ceramic artist and educator
- Andreson (footballer) (born 1985), Andreson Dourado Ribas, Brazilian football midfielder

== See also ==
- Anderson (surname)
