= Flight 402 =

Flight 402 may refer to:

- El Al Flight 402 (1955), shot down after straying into Bulgarian airspace
- Canadian Pacific Air Lines Flight 402 (1966), a DC-8 crashed when landing in Tokyo in poor visibility conditions
- TAM Transportes Aéreos Regionais Flight 402 (1996), a Fokker 100 with a faulty thrust reverser crashed after take-off from São Paulo
