= Ibsen Nelsen =

American architect (1919–2001)

- Nelsen in 1984
- Born: Ibsen Andreas Nelsen; October 2, 1919; Ruskin, Nebraska, United States
- Died: July 19, 2001 (aged 81); Vashon Island, Washington, United States
- Education: University of Oregon
- Occupation(s): Architect, urban planner
- Years active: 1951–1990
- Spouse: Ruth Hanawalt (m. 1946)
- Children: 4

Ibsen Andreas Nelsen (October 2, 1919 – July 19, 2001) was an American architect and urban planner active in the Pacific Northwest. He was born to a Danish immigrant family in Ruskin, Nebraska, which fled west during the Dust Bowl and settled in Medford, Oregon. After serving in the Pacific during World War II, he received his Bachelor of Architecture from the University of Oregon in 1951. After working for several smaller firms, he moved to Seattle, where he began his own practice in 1953. He partnered with Russell Sabin shortly afterwards, with Gordon Bennett Varey joining the firm in 1961 to form Nelsen, Sabin, & Varey. With the firm, Nelsen designed projects such as the home of painter Morris Graves in Loleta, California.

Nelsen left to form his own practice in 1967, where he designed the Museum of Flight and a series of academic facilities for Western Washington University. He frequently incorporated art and sculpture into his designs and worked in various architectural styles. In addition to his architectural work, he worked as an urban planner and historical preservationist. He helped to found the Seattle Design Commission and the Municipal Arts Commission of Seattle, and worked to protect and revitalize Pike Place Market and Pioneer Square.

== Early life ==
On October 2, 1919, Ibsen Andreas Nelsen was born in Ruskin, Nebraska, to a family of Danish immigrants. At twelve, he began learning carpentry and cabinetry while working for his father, Julius Nelsen, the owner of a construction firm. During the Dust Bowl, his family fled the plains to settle in Medford, Oregon. There, Nelsen attended high school. Following the United States' entry into World War II, he joined the Army and was deployed to the Southwest Pacific Theater, seeing combat as an infantryman in New Guinea. He was promoted to captain and received the Purple Heart and Bronze Star for his actions during the war.

== Architecture career ==
Following the war, Nelsen attended the University of Oregon with the support of the G.I. Bill provisions. He graduated with a Bachelor of Architecture degree in 1951 and moved to Seattle, Washington, where he was briefly employed as a draftsman by the firm Naramore, Bain, Brady & Johanson. Later that year, he transferred to Morrison–Knudsen, where he worked as a designer until leaving the company in 1952. He opened his own architectural practice in the University District the following year, shortly afterwards partnering with Russell Sabin to form the firm Nelsen & Sabin. Together, they designed the Regrade Investors Building in Seattle and a Latter Day Saints chapel in Mountlake Terrace, Washington. In 1961, they designed the Benjamin Weeks House in Seattle, Washington, for which they earned an Honor Award from the Seattle chapter of the American Institute of Architects (AIA). Gordon Bennett Varey joined the firm in 1961, leading to its rebranding as Nelsen, Sabin, & Varey. From 1956 to 1965, Nelsen taught as an assistant professor at the University of Washington.

He worked to protect Pike Place Market from a proposed redevelopment in the 1960s. During the 1980s, he worked closely with Fred Bassetti and George Bartholick on restoration work for the market and Pioneer Square.

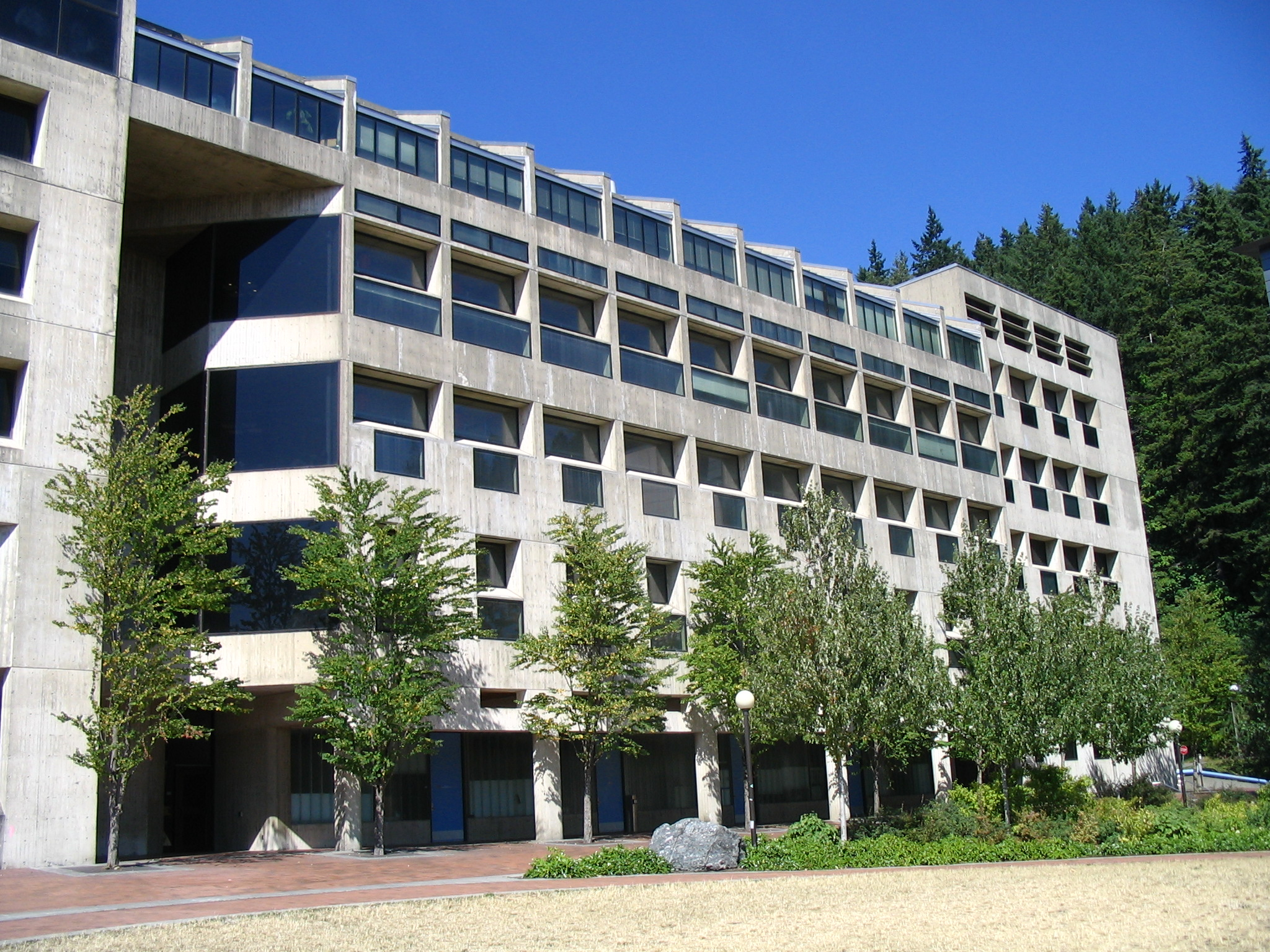
The Environmental Sciences Building at Western Washington University, Bellingham

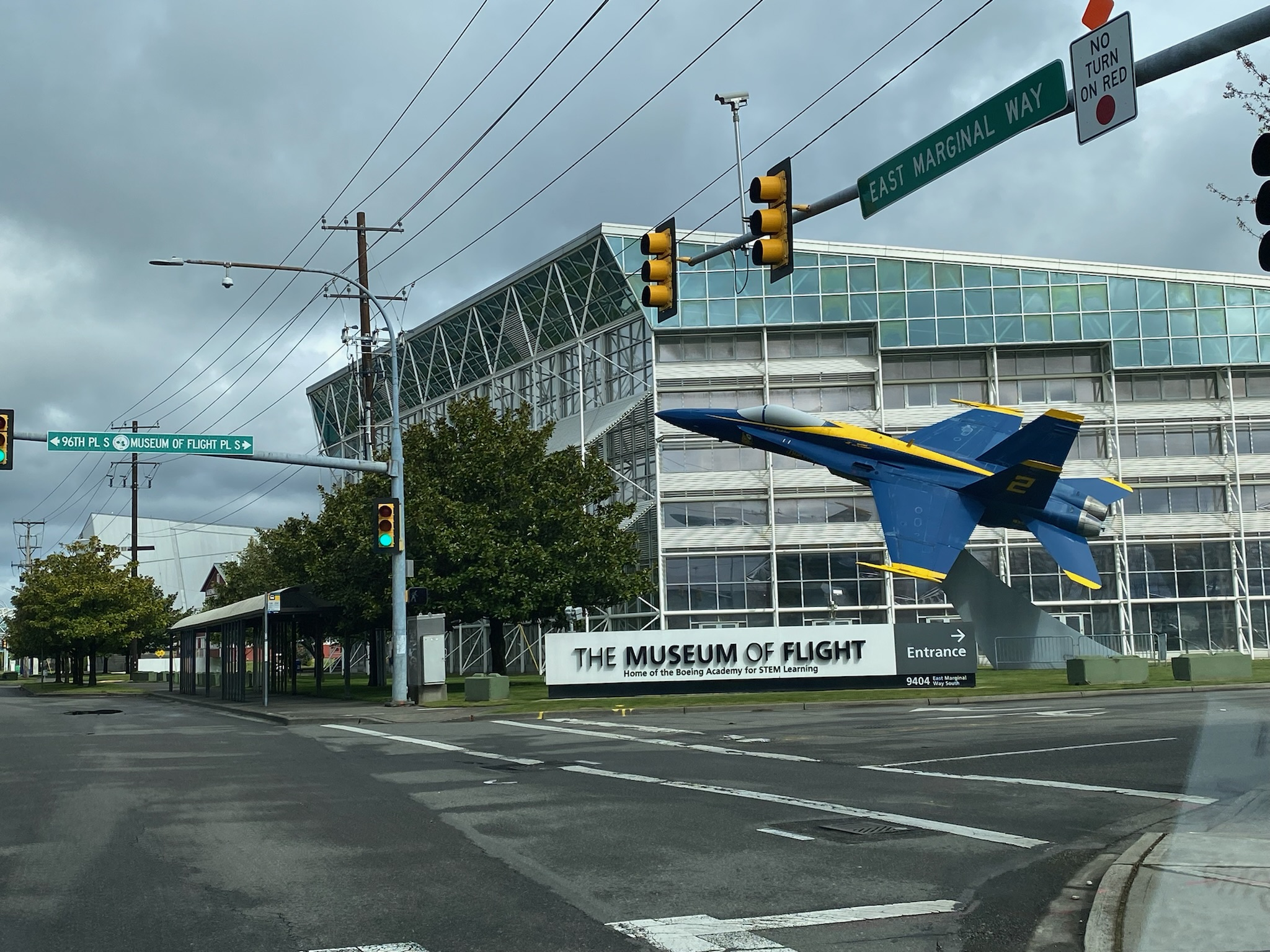
The Museum of Flight in Tukwila, Washington

He designed commissions such as alterations to the University of Washington's Playhouse Theatre and the lakeside residence of painter Morris Graves in Loleta, California; the San Francisco Chronicle described the latter as his most significant house. In 1967, he left Nelsen, Sabin, & Varey to begin a new private practice named Ibsen Nelsen & Associates. He embarked on a series of major commissions for Western Washington University in Bellingham, designing five campus buildings between 1968 and 1981. The Environmental Studies Center, his last design for the campus, was the first environmental sciences facility in the United States, and won an AIA Honor Award. He began work on the Museum of Flight in 1975, which he would continue until 1987.

From 1986 to 1990, Nelsen built his own home on Vashon Island, which he dubbed Island Farm, with a design inspired by traditional Danish farmhouses.

=== Style ===
Nelsen prioritized practical and inexpensive housing. Architect Arthur Skolnik described him as not favoring any specific architectural style, adopting different approaches depending on the client. He frequently integrated art and sculpture into his work, including ceramics and sculpture by his sons Eric and Hans. He helped sculptor Isamu Noguchi receive commissions in the northwest, including for Sky Viewing Sculpture at Western Washington University.

== Personal life ==
Nelsen married Ruth Hanawalt, originally from Puyallup, Washington, in 1946; they met while Nelsen served at Fort Lewis. They had four children. Nelsen was active in historic preservation, urban renewal, and art conservation campaigns. He helped to found the Seattle Design Commission, created as part of the Forward Thrust campaign, and the Municipal Arts Commission of Seattle. He served as the president of the arts commission from 1967 to 1968. He was a member of the Allied Arts of Seattle, serving as its president in 1969–1970. He was also a long-time member of the AIA; shortly after joining the institute in 1960, he served as the Seattle chapter's vice president from 1960 to 1961. He received an AIA Fellowship in 1981, and the AIA Seattle Medal in 1989.

During the 1970s, Nelsen organized a social club dubbed the "Chowder Society", which met at his home to discuss Seattle urban development. Members of the society included the future mayor, Paul Schell, and journalists Emmett Watson and David Brewster. He died on Vashon Island of complications from prostate cancer on July 19, 2001. His collected papers are held at Western Washington University.

== Works ==
Designs by Ibsen Nelsen
Name	Location	Date	Ref
House	11509 32nd Avenue NE, Seattle, Washington	1954	
Prudential Insurance Company of America	Seattle, Washington	1956	
Boy Scouts of American Headquarters Building	3120 Rainier Avenue S, Seattle, Washington	1959	
House	6105 SE 32nd St., Mercer Island, Washington	1959	
Renegade Investors Building	Seattle, Washington	1959–1960	
House	3011 Webster Point NE, Seattle, Washington	1960	
Alderwood Ward Chapel	Mountlake Terrace, Washington	1960–1961	
House	3201 W Laurelhurst Drive NE, Seattle, Washington	1961	
Robert Minto House	2603 NE 86th St., Seattle, Washington	1961	
Benjamin Weeks House	University of Washington, Seattle, Washington	1961	
House	760 Overlake Drive W, Medina, Washington	1962	
House	3827 E Crocket St., Seattle, Washington	1964	
Morris Graves House	Loleta, California	1965–1967	
Hughes Playhouse Theatre (remodel)	University of Washington, Seattle, Washington	1966	
Campus Christian Ministry	3525 19th Avenue SE, Seattle, Washington	1967	
Miller Hall	Western Washington University, Bellingham, Washington	1967–1968	
Bond Hall	Western Washington University, Bellingham, Washington	1967–1968	
Artnzen Hall	Western Washington University, Bellingham, Washington	1972	
Social Science Building	Western Washington University, Bellingham, Washington	1974	
A. E. Doyle Building (interior remodel)	Seattle, Washington	1973	
Guthrie Hall	3921 West Stevens Way NE, Seattle, Washington	1973	
Washington Governor's Mansion (interior remodel)	Olympia, Washington	1974	
Inn at the Market	Seattle, Washington	1975–1982	
Stewart House	Seattle, Washington	1975–1982	
Museum of Flight	Tukwila, Washington	1975–1987	
University of Washington Academic Computer Center	University of Washington, Seattle, Washington	1976–1977	
Northwest Environmental Studies Center	Western Washington University, Bellingham, Washington	1981	
Merrill Court Townhouses	Seattle, Washington	1981–1986	
Roanoke Reef Townhouses	Seattle, Washington	1984–1986	
Island Farm (Ibsen Nelsen House)	Vashon Island, Washington	1986–1990	
