= Canadian Pacific Air Lines Flight 402 =

1966 deadly plane crash in Tokyo, Japan

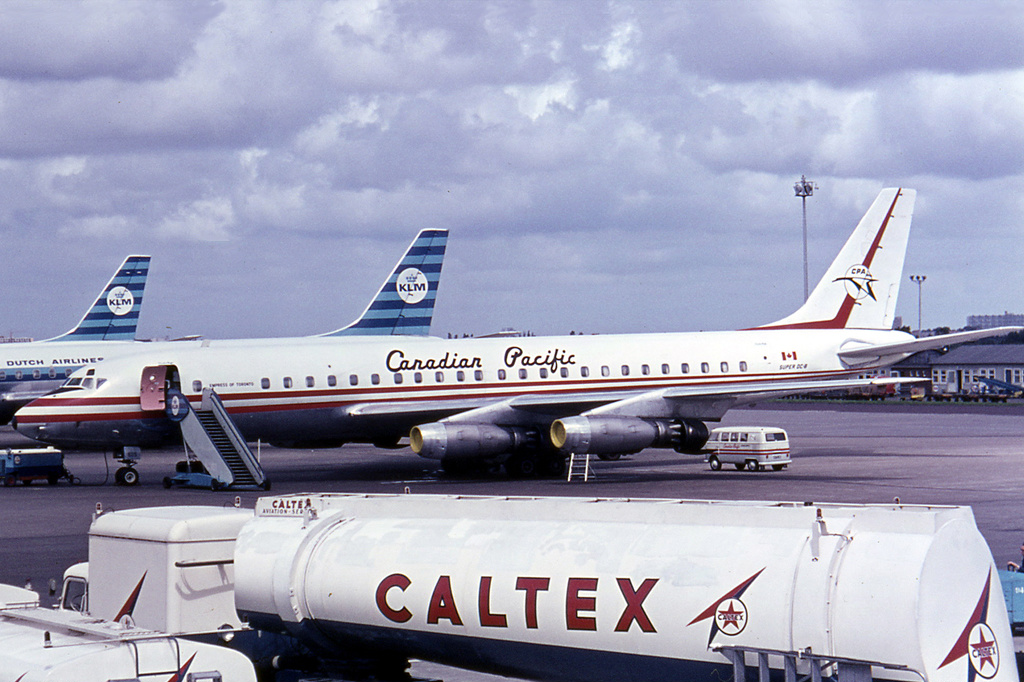
- A Douglas DC-8-43 of Canadian Pacific Airlines, similar to the accident aircraft

Accident
- Date: 4 March 1966
- Summary: Controlled flight into terrain due to poor visibility
- Site: Haneda Airport, Tokyo, Japan; 35°32′16″N 139°48′23″E

Aircraft
- Aircraft type: Douglas DC-8-43
- Aircraft name: Empress of Edmonton
- Operator: Canadian Pacific Air Lines
- IATA flight No.: CP402
- ICAO flight No.: CPC402
- Call sign: EMPRESS 402
- Registration: CF-CPK
- Flight origin: Kai Tak International Airport, Hong Kong
- Stopover: Haneda Airport, Tokyo, Japan
- Destination: Vancouver International Airport, British Columbia, Canada
- Occupants: 72
- Passengers: 62
- Crew: 10
- Fatalities: 64
- Injuries: 8
- Survivors: 8

On March 4, 1966, Canadian Pacific Air Lines Flight 402 struck the approach lights and a seawall during a night landing attempt in poor visibility at Haneda Airport in Tokyo, Japan. Of the 62 passengers and 10 crew, only 8 passengers survived.

== Background ==
=== Aircraft ===
The aircraft involved was a McDonnell Douglas DC-8-43, registration CF-CPK, c/n 45761/237, delivered to the airline on October 14, 1965. It was powered by four Rolls-Royce Conway 508-12 turbofan engines and had flown 1,792 hours by the time of the accident.

=== Crew ===
The captain was 57-year-old Cecil N. McNeal, who had logged 26,564 flight hours, including 4,089 hours on the Douglas DC-8. The first officer was 58-year-old Charles F. K. Mews, who had 19,789 flight hours, with 3,071 of them on the Douglas DC-8. The flight engineer was 34-year-old William J. Robertson. who had 7,992 flight hours, 3,437 of which were on the Douglas DC-8.

== Course of events ==
Flight 402 was a Hong Kong to Tokyo to Vancouver flight, which took off at 16:14 Japan Time from Kai Tak International Airport on the first leg of the journey. The flight was in a holding pattern for 38 minutes, waiting for visibility at the destination to improve from landing minima. The tower controller cleared the flight for an instrument approach when visibility improved to 2,400 ft (700 m), but the crew cancelled the approach when visibility dropped again. At 19:58 local time, the pilot asked Air Traffic control for a diversion to Songshan Airport, Taiwan and commenced a climb from 3000 ft. At 20:05 while enroute to Taipei climbing through 11500 ft the pilot was advised the visibility at the airport had increased above minimums to 0.5 mi (0.80 km) with a Runway visual range of 3,000 ft (900 m). The pilot then decided to make another approach.

The ground-controlled approach was normal until 1 mi (1.6 km) when the aircraft was advised that it was 20 ft (6 m) too low and advised to level off momentarily. Nevertheless the aircraft continued its approach 20 ft below and in parallel with the glide slope. After the aircraft passed the precision minimum the crew requested the intensity of the runway lights be reduced. Shortly thereafter the aircraft made a sharp descent, and at 2,800 ft (850 m) from the runway threshold, the aircraft's landing gear struck sequentially eleven of the approach lights. The pilot lost control of the aircraft after it hit the seawall at the runway threshold, leaving a 0.5 mi (0.80 km) trail of burning wreckage on the airfield. Sixty-four people, including all ten crew members, were killed.

== Investigation ==
The Japanese government-appointed investigation team concluded in their report, issued two years later, that there was no fault in the airport's control tower. They stated the cause was pilot error, while acknowledging that poor visibility could have caused an optical illusion that confused the pilot. The probable cause statement was that the "Pilot misjudged landing approach under unusually difficult weather conditions."

== Crashes in Japan ==
This accident was one of five fatal aircraft disasters in Japan in 1966. Less than 24 hours later, BOAC Flight 911, a Boeing 707, was filmed taxing past the still smoldering wreckage of the DC-8, then broke up in flight shortly after departure when it encountered extreme clear-air turbulence in the lee of Mount Fuji while flying the opposite direction towards Hong Kong, killing all 124 passengers and crew. This brought the total death toll from both accidents to 188 in less than 24 hours.

Less than a month before, All Nippon Airways Flight 60, a Boeing 727, crashed into Tokyo Bay while on approach to land at the same airport, killing all 133 aboard. In addition, two other incidents occurred, on August 26 and November 13. The combined effect of these five accidents shook public confidence in commercial aviation in Japan, and both Japan Air Lines and All Nippon Airways were forced to cut back some domestic service due to reduced demand.
