= Eyvin Andersen =

Danish organist, violinist, and composer

- Born: 24 February 1914; Colorado, USA
- Died: 18 October 1969 (aged 55); Copenhagen, Denmark
- Other name: Ejvin Andersen
- Education: Royal Danish Academy of Music

Eyvin (Ejvin) Andersen (24 February 1914 – 18 October 1968) was a Danish organist, violist, and composer.

In the course of his career, Andersen was an organist at Vartov Church, a violist in the Danish National Symphony Orchestra, a teacher at the Academy of Music and Dramatic Arts in Esbjerg, and the founder of the School for Old Music.

== Biography ==
Eyvin (or Ejvin) was born 24 February 1914 in Colorado, USA. His mother, Gudrun Pedersen Østergaard, was a teacher, and his father, Indslev Kristian Andersen, was a priest. He and his younger brother, Aksel Andersen, studied chamber music from a young age with their father. He later studied at the Royal Danish Academy of Music.

Andersen performed as a violist in the Danish National Symphony Orchestra. Alongside Ragnhild Toft and Lavard Friisholm, he established the Frit Forum for Musik (English: Free Forum for Music) in 1944. The organisation functioned as an alternative to Det Unge Tonekunstnerselskab, a branch of the International Society for Contemporary Music which was censored heavily during WWII. The organisation dissolved in 1947, soon after the war had ended.

Andersen specialized in baroque music and worked to make 18th-century music accessible in his time. He established the School for Old Music (Danish: Skolen for gammel musik) which focused on music from before 1750. He taught vocal music, music theory, and the baroque violin at the school. Among the school's other teachers was composer Tage Nielsen, who taught lute and guitar.

He died in Copenhagen on 18 October 1969. At the time he had been the organist at Vartov Church, a position which his brother, Aksel, took over after Eyvin's death.
