= Ruskin, Nebraska =

- Village
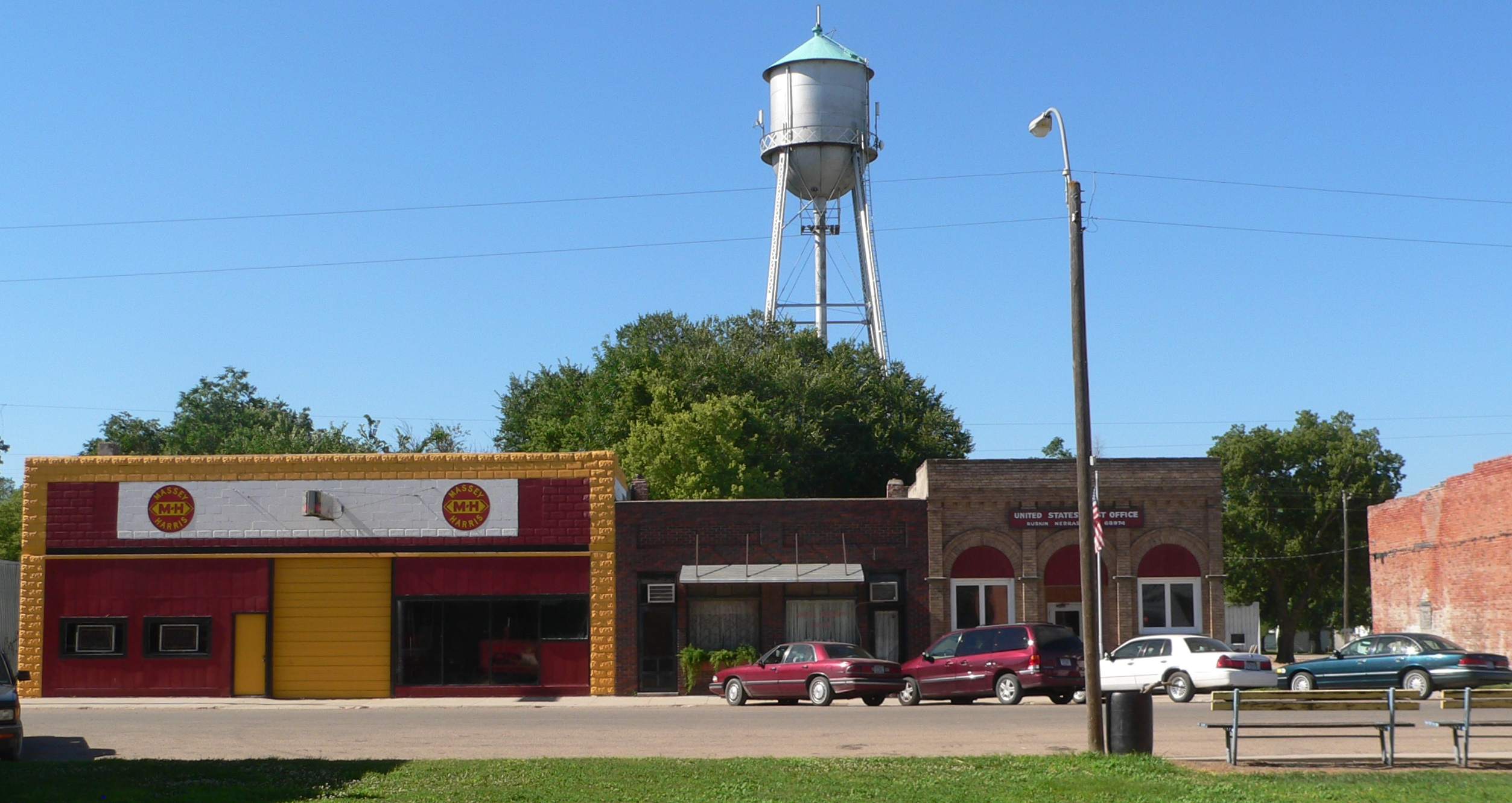
- Downtown Ruskin: north side of Main Street

- Location of Ruskin, Nebraska
- Coordinates: 40°08′38″N 97°52′01″W
- Country: United States
- State: Nebraska
- County: Nuckolls

Area
  - Total: 0.42 sq mi (1.08 km^{2})
  - Land: 0.42 sq mi (1.08 km^{2})
  - Water: 0 sq mi (0.00 km^{2})
- Elevation: 1,673 ft (510 m)

Population (2020)
  - Total: 105
  - Density: 251.0/sq mi (96.92/km^{2})
- Time zone: UTC-6 (Central (CST))
  - Summer (DST): UTC-5 (CDT)
- ZIP code: 68974
- Area code: 402
- FIPS code: 31-42810
- GNIS feature ID: 2399145

Ruskin is a village in Nuckolls County, Nebraska, United States. As of the 2020 census, Ruskin had a population of 105.

== History ==
Ruskin was established in 1887 when the Chicago, Rock Island & Pacific Railroad was extended to that point. It was named after John Ruskin, an English academic and art critic.

== Geography ==
According to the United States Census Bureau, the village has a total area of 0.42 square miles (1.09 km^{2}), all land.

== Demographics ==
Historical population
Census	Pop.	Note	%±
1910	339		—
1920	360		6.2%
1930	239		−33.6%
1940	223		−6.7%
1950	214		−4.0%
1960	203		−5.1%
1970	229		12.8%
1980	224		−2.2%
1990	187		−16.5%
2000	195		4.3%
2010	123		−36.9%
2020	105		−14.6%
U.S. Decennial Census; 2012 Estimate

=== 2010 census ===
As of the census of 2010, there were 123 people, 61 households, and 36 families residing in the village. The population density was 292.9 inhabitants per square mile (113.1/km^{2}). There were 78 housing units at an average density of 185.7 per square mile (71.7/km^{2}). The racial makeup of the village was 94.3% White and 5.7% from other races. Hispanic or Latino of any race were 7.3% of the population.

There were 61 households, of which 18.0% had children under the age of 18 living with them, 55.7% were married couples living together, 3.3% had a female householder with no husband present, and 41.0% were non-families. 39.3% of all households were made up of individuals, and 24.6% had someone living alone who was 65 years of age or older. The average household size was 2.02 and the average family size was 2.67.

The median age in the village was 51.5 years. 16.3% of residents were under the age of 18; 3.3% were between the ages of 18 and 24; 19.6% were from 25 to 44; 33.4% were from 45 to 64; and 27.6% were 65 years of age or older. The gender makeup of the village was 52.0% male and 48.0% female.

=== 2000 census ===
As of the census of 2000, there were 195 people, 78 households, and 57 families residing in the village. The population density was 466.6 inhabitants per square mile (180.2/km^{2}). There were 86 housing units at an average density of 205.8 per square mile (79.5/km^{2}). The racial makeup of the village was 95.90% White, 3.59% from other races, and 0.51% from two or more races. Hispanic or Latino of any race were 6.15% of the population.

There were 78 households, out of which 33.3% had children under the age of 18 living with them, 71.8% were married couples living together, 1.3% had a female householder with no husband present, and 26.9% were non-families. 26.9% of all households were made up of individuals, and 16.7% had someone living alone who was 65 years of age or older. The average household size was 2.50 and the average family size was 3.04.

In the village, the population was spread out, with 26.2% under the age of 18, 4.6% from 18 to 24, 25.1% from 25 to 44, 22.1% from 45 to 64, and 22.1% who were 65 years of age or older. The median age was 40 years. For every 100 females, there were 87.5 males. For every 100 females age 18 and over, there were 97.3 males.

As of 2000 the median income for a household in the village was $28,750, and the median income for a family was $31,250. Males had a median income of $22,361 versus $17,344 for females. The per capita income for the village was $13,130. About 3.5% of families and 8.6% of the population were below the poverty line, including 22.6% of those under the age of eighteen and none of those 65 or over.

== Notable person ==
- Aksel Andersen, musician
- Ibsen Nelsen, architect
