= All Nippon Airways Flight 60 =

1966 aviation accident in Japan

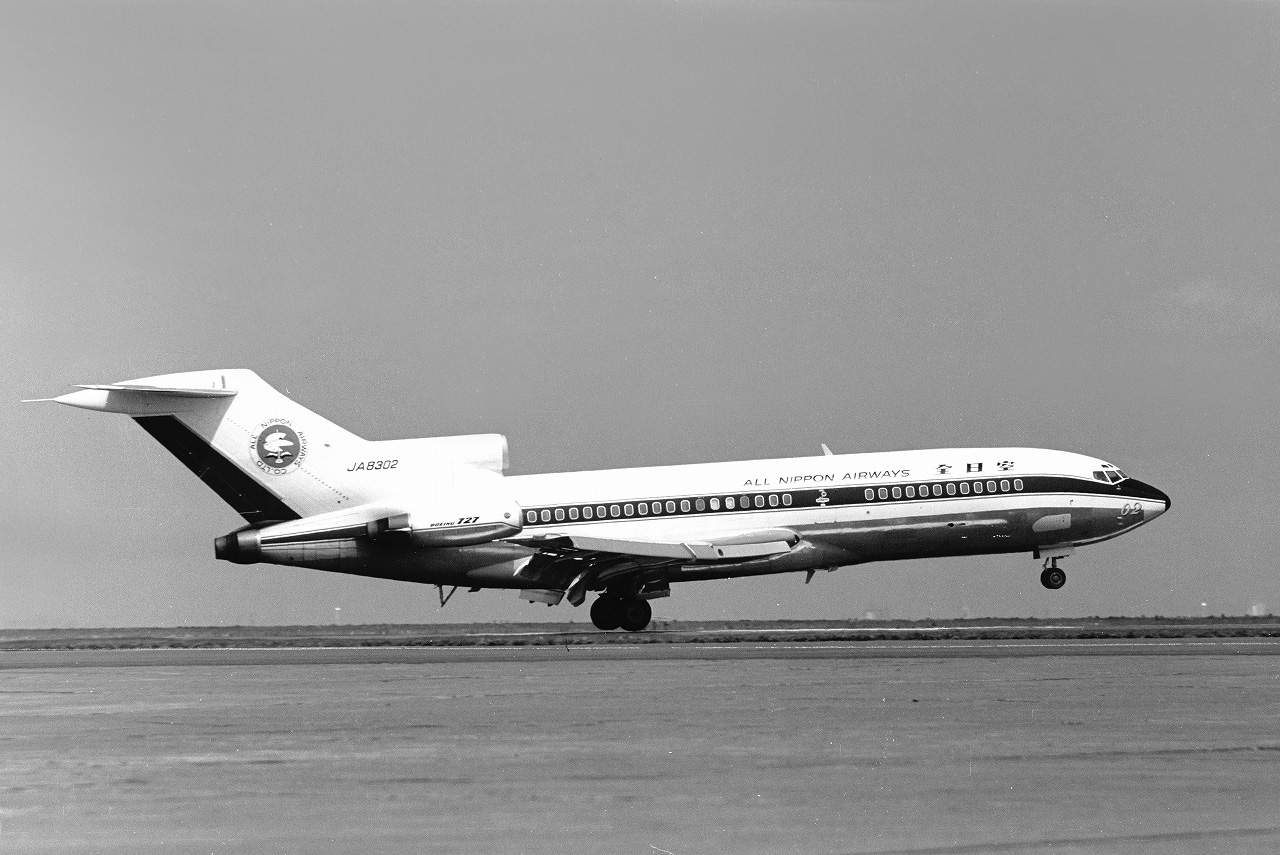
- JA8302, the aircraft involved in the accident, pictured in 1965

Accident
- Date: February 4, 1966
- Summary: Crashed into Tokyo Bay due to undetermined reasons
- Site: Tokyo Bay, near Haneda International Airport, Tokyo, Japan; 35°29′27″N 139°51′23″E

Aircraft
- Aircraft type: Boeing 727-81
- Operator: All Nippon Airways
- IATA flight No.: NH60
- ICAO flight No.: ANA60
- Call sign: ALL NIPPON 8302
- Registration: JA8302
- Flight origin: Chitose Airport
- Destination: Haneda International Airport
- Occupants: 133
- Passengers: 126
- Crew: 7
- Fatalities: 133
- Survivors: 0

All Nippon Airways Flight 60 was a Boeing 727-81 aircraft making a domestic commercial flight in Japan from Sapporo Chitose Airport to Tokyo Haneda International Airport. On February 4, 1966, the plane crashed into Tokyo Bay about 10.4 km (6.5 mi; 5.6 nmi) from Haneda in clear weather conditions while on a night approach. All 133 people on board died. The accident was the worst involving a single aircraft in Japan and the deadliest accident in the country until All Nippon Airways Flight 58 crashed five years later, killing 162 people.

== Passengers and crew ==
The aircraft carried 126 passengers and a crew of seven. Most of the passengers were returning from the annual Sapporo Snow Festival, 600 miles (970 km) north of Tokyo.

== Accident description ==
Flying in clear weather, ANA Flight 60 was a few minutes away from Haneda Airport when its pilot radioed that he would land visually without instruments. The aircraft then disappeared from radar screens.

Villagers along the shore and the pilot of another plane said they saw flames in the sky at about 7 p.m., which was approximately the time that the plane was due to land. Fishermen and Japanese Defense Force boats retrieved approximately 20 bodies from the bay when an airline spokesman announced that the fuselage had been found with scores of bodies inside. The spokesman said this led to the belief that all 133 persons on board were dead. Grappling hooks from a Coast Guard boat brought up the wreckage.

The tail of the aircraft, including at least two of the three engines, the vertical stabilizer, and the horizontal stabilizer were recovered mostly intact. The rest of the aircraft had disintegrated on impact. The death toll of 133 made the crash the world's deadliest single-aircraft accident at the time, as well as the second-deadliest aviation accident behind the 1960 New York mid-air collision. The cause of the accident was never determined. This aircraft was not equipped with flight recorders.

== Series of crashes ==
This accident was one of five fatal air disasters in Japan in 1966. One month after ANA Flight 60's crash, Canadian Pacific Air Lines Flight 402, a Douglas DC-8, struck the approach lights and a seawall at Haneda, killing 64 of 72 on board. Less than 24 hours later, BOAC Flight 911, a Boeing 707, was photographed as it taxied past the still smoldering wreckage of the Canadian jet. The aircraft broke up shortly after departure while in flight above Mount Fuji due to clear-air turbulence, killing all 124 passengers and 11 crew. A Japan Airlines Convair 880-22M crashed and killed five people on August 26. Finally, All Nippon Airways Flight 533 crashed and killed 50 people on November 13. The combined effect of these five accidents shook public confidence in commercial aviation in Japan, and both Japan Airlines and All Nippon Airways were forced to cut back some domestic services due to reduced demand.
