= Miguel Calmon =

Municipality of Bahia, Brazil

Coordinates: 11°25′44″S 40°35′42″W

- Municipality
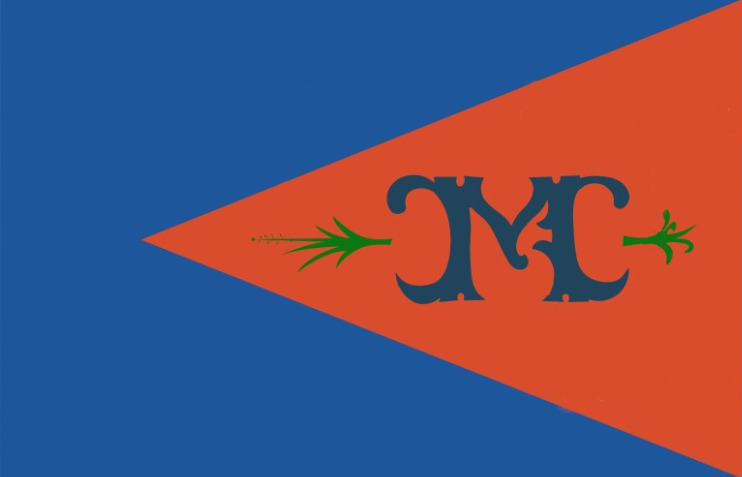
- Flag

- Location in Bahia
- Country: Brazil
- Region: Nordeste
- State: Bahia

Population (2020)
  - Total: 25,894
- Time zone: UTC−3 (BRT)

Miguel Calmon is a municipality in the state of Bahia in the North-East region of Brazil.

The municipality contains the 2,821-hectare (6,970-acre) Sete Passagens State Park, created in 2000.

== Notable people ==
- Andreson Dourado Ribas, footballer

== See also ==
- List of municipalities in Bahia
