= Sete Passagens State Park =

State park in Bahia, Brazil

- Parque Estadual das Sete Passagens
- IUCN category II (national park)
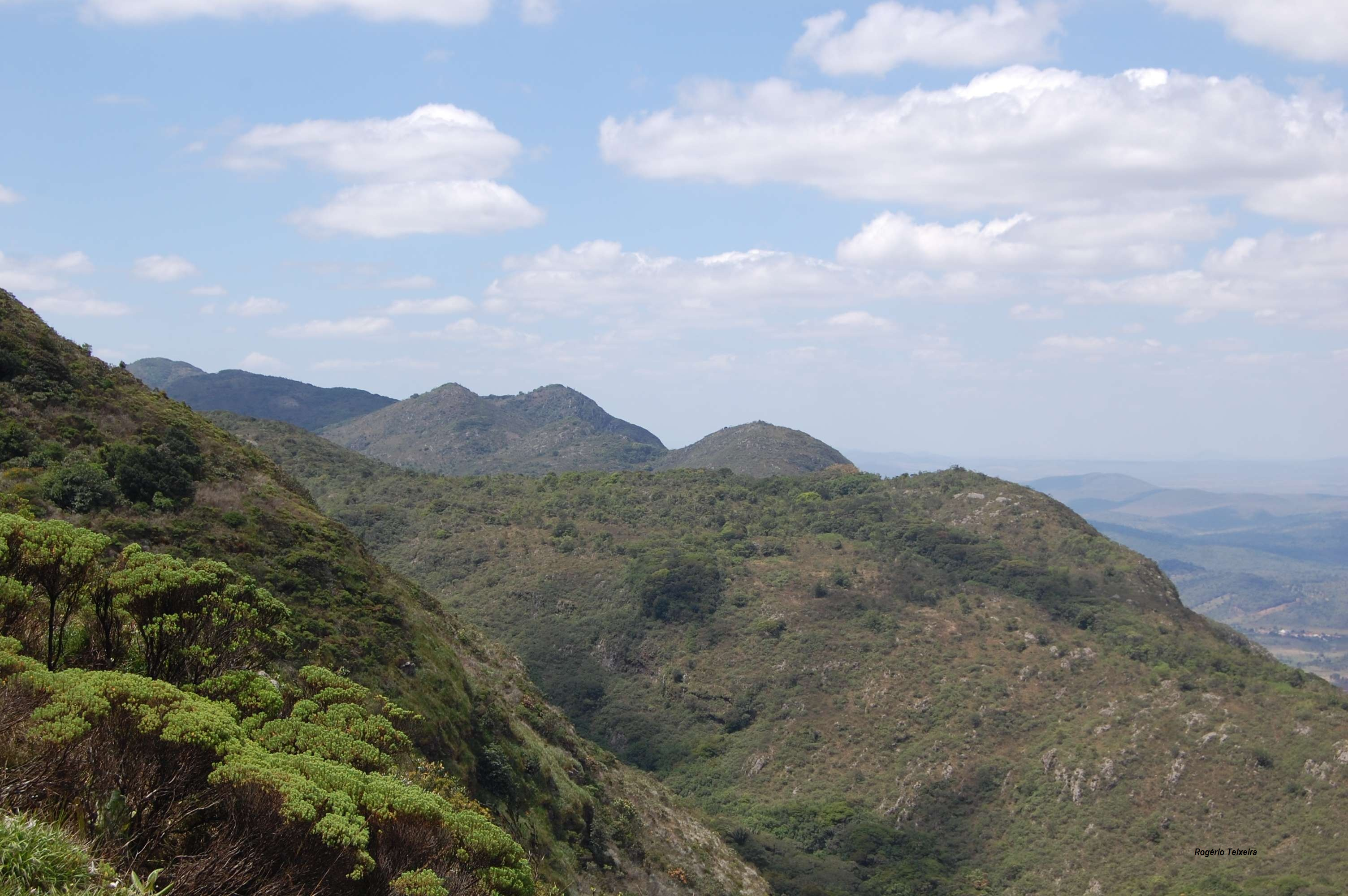
- Landscape of the park in October 2013

- Location within Brazil
- Nearest city: Miguel Calmon, Bahia
- Coordinates: 11°23′20″S 40°31′27″W
- Area: 2,821 ha (10.89 sq mi)
- Designation: State park
- Created: 24 May 2000
- Administrator: INEMA

The Sete Passagens State Park (Portuguese: Parque Estadual das Sete Passagens) is a state park in the state of Bahia, Brazil. It protects a mountainous region in the transition between Atlantic Forest and Caatinga.

== Location ==
The Sete Passagens State Park is in the municipality of Miguel Calmon, Bahia, with an estimated area of 2,821 hectares (6,970 acres). It is in the Chapada Norte region of the state, 367 kilometres (228 mi) from Salvador, the state capital. It is in the Itapicuru River basin. It is an important source of water in a drought-prone area, with numerous springs that supply streams to contribute to the Itapicuru-Mirim River, a major tributary of the Itapicuru. The park covers the Campo Limpo, Sapucaia and Jaqueira ranges to the south of the Jacobina range. The park contains dozens of greens hills cut by valleys. The highest point has an altitude of 1,270 metres (4,170 ft). There are prehistoric rock paintings in a small grotto at the top of the mountain.

== History ==
The Sete Passagens State Park was created by state decree 7.808 of 24 May 2000.

== Environment ==
The Sete Passagens State Park holds areas of great importance for conservation. It has diverse flora and fauna, with several endangered species. Vegetation includes seasonal forest in the transition from Atlantic Forest to Caatinga, and rocky fields at high altitudes. Mammals include howler monkeys, Coimbra Filho's titi (Callicebus coimbrai), coatis, southern tamandua (Tamandua tetradactyla), tayra (Eira barbara) and the endangered golden-bellied capuchin (Sapajus xanthosternos). Birds include hawks, hummingbirds, tinamous, common quail (Coturnix coturnix), seriemas and neotropical bellbirds.

There are more than a dozen waterfalls surrounded by untouched forest. These include the Jajai, "S" Verde, Espirro, Coração, Sinvaldo, Bico do Urubu, Encontro das Águas, Cadeiras da Natureza, Tucano and Portal falls. Sinvaldo Waterfall is the highest, with a sheer drop of 168 metres (551 ft). The Coração Waterfall has a drop of 35 metres (115 ft). There are access trails to the waterfalls and to belvederes that provide lookouts over the park and its landscape of mountains and valleys.

There are no conflicts over land ownership and the park's staff is effective in monitoring the area, so it does not suffer from problems such as hunting, deforestation and agriculture. However, farm owners pursue these activities in the immediate surroundings, and there is a constant threat of illegal mining, particularly of gold, around and within the park.

== Sources ==
- Parque Estadual das Sete Passagens (in Portuguese), INEMA: Instituto do Meio Ambiente e Recursos Hídricos
- Parque Estadual Sete Passagens (in Portuguese), Via Rural, archived from the original on June 13, 2009
