= Andriessen =

Andriessen is a Dutch patronymic surname meaning son of Andries cognate to the surnames Andrews and Anderson. People named Andriessen or Andriesse include:

== Andriessen ==
- Adrie Andriessen (1960–2021), Dutch footballer
- Anthonie Andriessen (1746–1813), Dutch painter
- Christiaan Andriessen (1775–1846), Dutch draftsman, son of Jurriaan Andriessen (artist)
- Frans Andriessen (1929–2019), Dutch politician
- Hendrick Andriessen (1607–1655), Flemish painter
- Hendrik Andriessen (1892–1981), Dutch composer, brother of Willem and Mari
- Jurriaan Andriessen (artist) (1742–1819), Dutch decorative painter
- Jurriaan Andriessen (composer) (1925–1996), Dutch composer, son of Hendrik Andriessen
- Koos Andriessen (1928–2019), Dutch politician
- Louis Andriessen (1939–2021), Dutch composer, son of Hendrik Andriessen
- Mari Andriessen (1897–1977), Dutch sculptor, brother of Willem and Hendrik
- Willem Andriessen (1887–1964), Dutch pianist and composer, brother of Hendrik and Mari

== Purely patronymic ==
- Albert Andriessen Bradt (1607–1687), Norwegian-born settler from Amsterdam in New Amsterdam

== Andriesse ==
- Cornelis Dirk Andriesse (born 1939), Dutch physicist
- Emmy Andriesse (1914–1953), Dutch photographer

== See also ==
- Andreessen (disambiguation)
- Andreassen
- Andreasson
- Andresen
- Andersen
- Anderiesen
