= Andreassen =

Andreassen is a common surname in Norway, meaning "son of Andreas". The parallel Danish forms are Andresen and Andreasen, the Swedish Andreasson. It may refer to:

- Anita Andreassen, Norwegian mushing competitor; she has also competed in cycling and cross country skiing
- Bjørn Andreassen (1946–2015), Norwegian ice hockey player
- Cesilie Andreassen (born 1996), Norwegian footballer
- Elisabeth Andreassen (born 1958), known as "Bettan", a Norwegian singer
- Karin Andreassen, Norwegian marine geologist and marine geophysicist
- Geir Hartly Andreassen, FSF (born 1971), Norwegian cinematographer based in Stockholm, Sweden
- Gunn Margit Andreassen (born 1973), Norwegian biathlete
- Gunnar Andreassen (1913–2002), Norwegian football player and manager
- Harald Magnus Andreassen (born 1956), Norwegian economist
- Harriet Andreassen (1925–1997), Norwegian labour activist and politician for the Labour Party
- John Andreassen (1943–2026), Norwegian TV-producer with the Norwegian Broadcasting Corporation
- Kjell Schou-Andreassen (1940–1997), Norwegian footballer and one of the country's most successful football managers
- Kristin Andreassen, American musician and dancer
- Kyrre Andreassen (born 1971), Norwegian author and translator
- Marit Andreassen (born 1966), Norwegian actress, born in Svolvær
- Ole Petter Andreassen (born 1970), Norwegian musician and producer from Flekkefjord, Norway
- Reidar Andreassen (born 1932), Norwegian long-distance runner and cross-country skier
- Rolf Andreassen (born 1949), Norwegian competition rower and Olympic medalist
- Tor Arne Andreassen (born 1983), Norwegian footballer who plays as a defender and midfielder
- Tormod Andreasen (born 1950), Norwegian curler

== See also ==
- Andreessen (disambiguation)
- Andriessen
- Andersen
