= Smiður Andrésson =

Icelandic politician (died 1361)

Smiður Andrésson (died July 1362) was governor (hirðstjóri) in Iceland whose reputation for brutal methods in collecting taxes led to an attack on him at Grund in Eyjafjörður, where he was slain along with Jón Guttormsson skráveifa and six of his men.
