= Andreasson BA-11 =

BA-11

General information
- Type: Sports plane
- Designer: Björn Andreasson

History
- First flight: 1977

The Andreasson BA-11 was an acrobatic biplane designed for homebuilding. The design was based on that of the BA-4B, but the BA-11 added a second cockpit in tandem with the pilot's, and a more powerful engine.

== Specifications ==
General characteristics

- Crew: one pilot
- Capacity: 1 passenger
- Powerplant: 1 × Lycoming AEIO-360-A1B6 , 150 kW (200 hp)

== See also ==
Related development

- BA-2 -
- BA-3 -
- BA-4/BA-4B -
- BA-6 -
- BA-7 -
- BA-11
