= Knud Andersen =

Knud Andersen may refer to:

- Knud Andersen (cyclist) (1922–1997), Danish cyclist
- Knud Andersen (footballer, born 1900) (1900–1967), Danish footballer
- Knud Andersen (footballer, born 1917) (1917–2003), Danish footballer
- Knud Andersen (mammalogist) (1867–1918), Danish zoologist
- K. B. Andersen (1914–1984), Danish politician
