= DINFIA IA 53 =

IA 53 Mamboretá
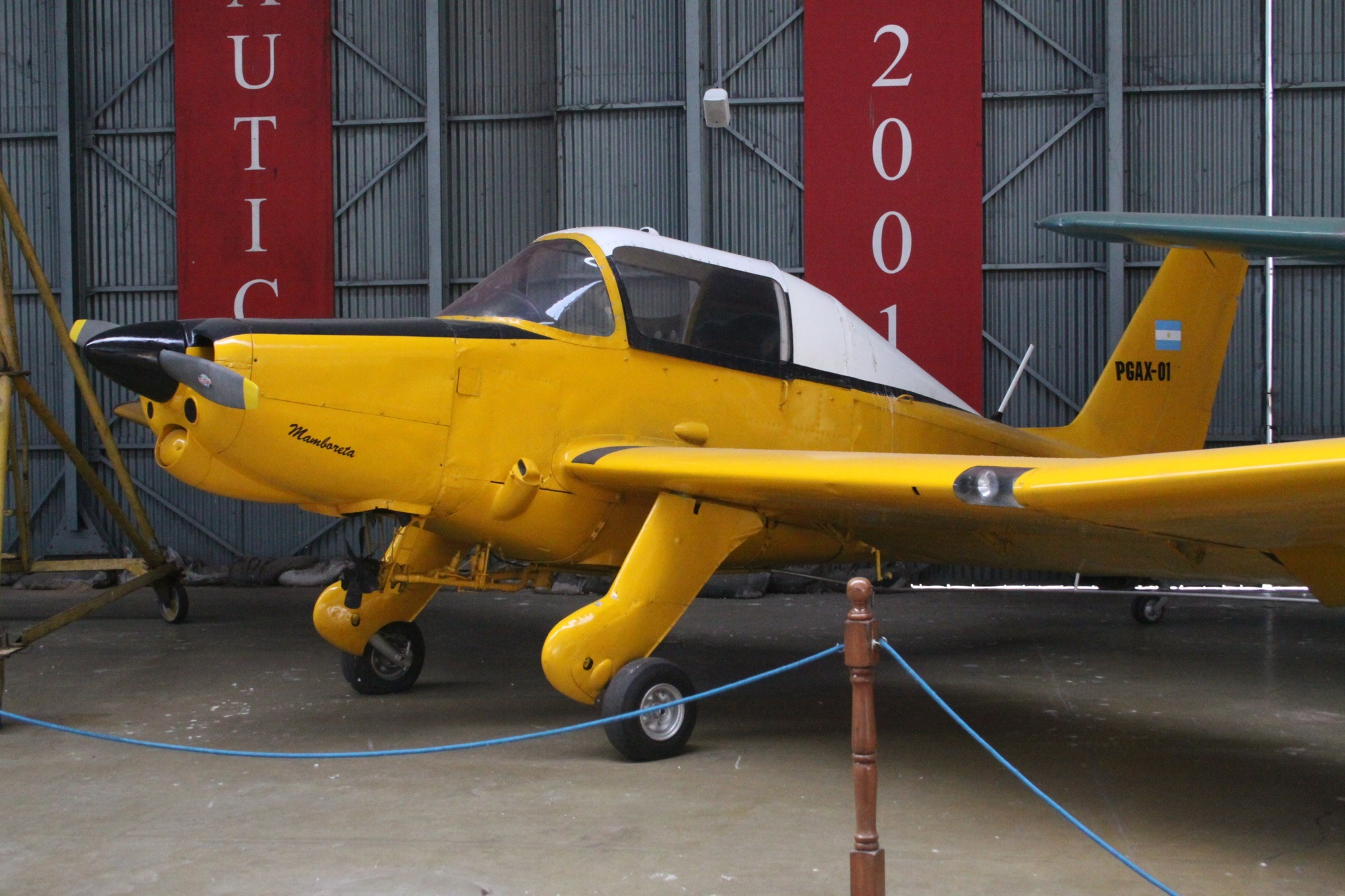

General information
- Type: Agricultural aircraft
- Manufacturer: DINFIA
- Number built: 2

History
- First flight: ca. 1965

The DINFIA IA 53 Mamboretá (Guaraní for "Praying Mantis") was an agricultural aircraft developed in Argentina by DINFIA in the 1960s.

== Description ==
The IA 53 was a single-engine low-wing cantilever monoplane of conventional undercarriage configuration with fixed tailwheel. Accommodation for the pilot and a single passenger was provided under a broad bubble canopy.

Two prototypes were constructed, with the type making its first flight on 10 November 1966. No production followed, with FMA instead building the Cessna 188 under license.

== Aircraft on display ==
One aircraft is preserved at the Museo Nacional de Aeronáutica de Argentina in Morón, Buenos Aires.

== Specifications ==
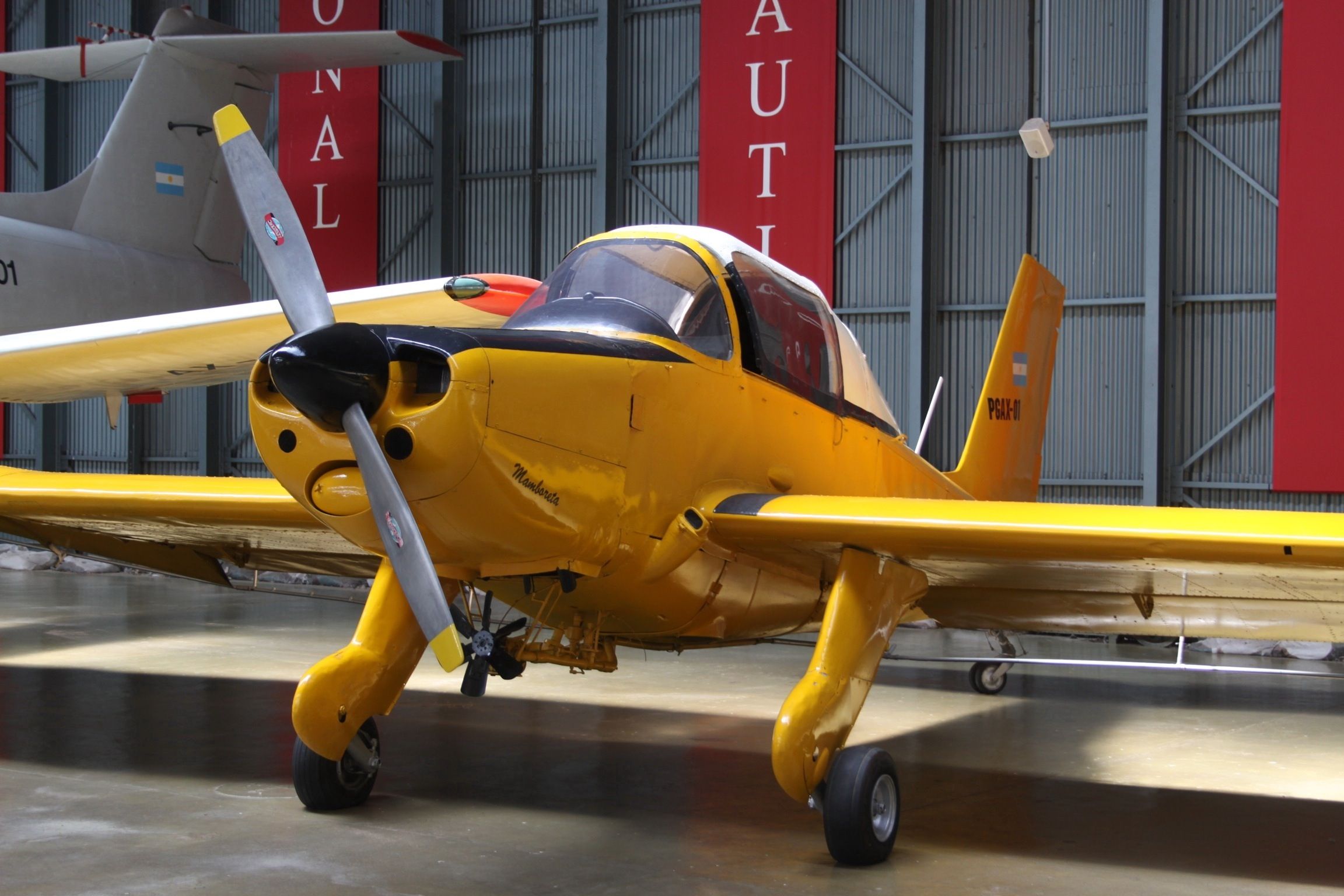
Front view of the preserved IA 53

Data from Jane's All The World's Aircraft 1969–70

General characteristics

- Crew: 1
- Length: 8.20 m (26 ft 11 in)
- Wingspan: 11.60 m (38 ft 1 in)
- Height: 3.30 m (10 ft 10 in)
- Wing area: 21.52 m^{2} (231.6 sq ft)
- Aspect ratio: 6.25:1
- Airfoil: NACA 4412
- Empty weight: 844 kg (1,861 lb)
- Max takeoff weight: 1,525 kg (3,362 lb)
- Fuel capacity: 180 L (40 imp gal; 48 US gal)
- Powerplant: 1 × Lycoming O-540-B2B5 air-cooled flat-six engine, 175 kW (235 hp)

Performance

- Maximum speed: 215 km/h (134 mph, 116 kn)
- Cruise speed: 185 km/h (115 mph, 100 kn)
- Range: 650 km (400 mi, 350 nmi)
- Service ceiling: 3,600 m (11,800 ft)
- Rate of climb: 3.84 m/s (755 ft/min)
