= BOAC Flight 911 =

1966 aviation accident in Japan

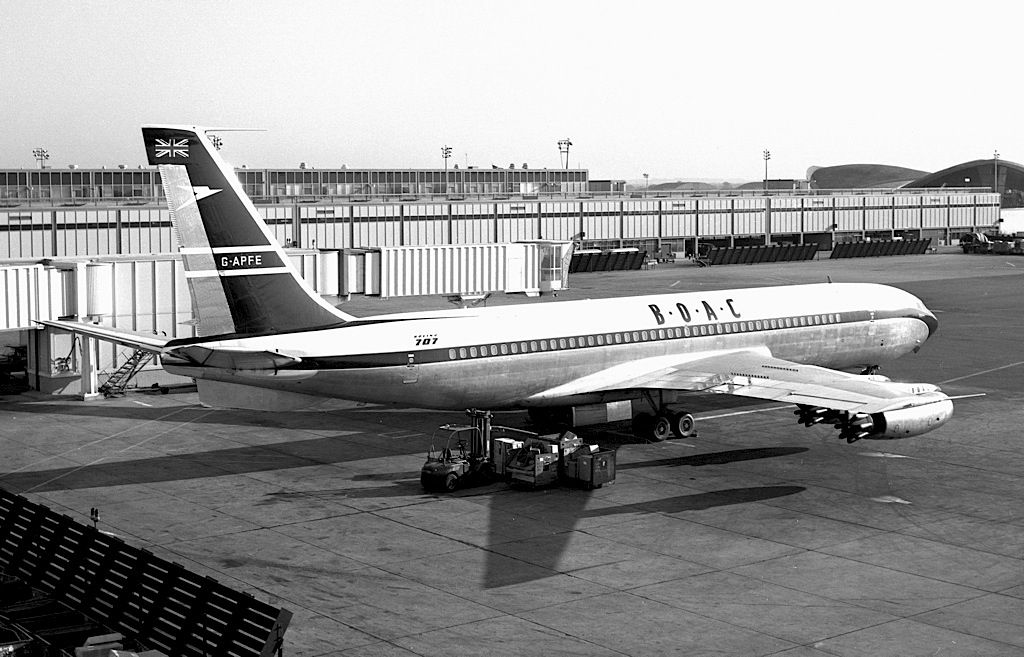
- G-APFE, the aircraft involved in the accident, seen in 1962 with a previous livery

Accident
- Date: March 5, 1966
- Summary: In-flight break-up caused by severe turbulence
- Site: Mount Fuji, Japan; 35°19′59″N 138°48′17″E

Aircraft
- Aircraft type: Boeing 707-436
- Operator: British Overseas Airways Corporation
- IATA flight No.: BA911
- ICAO flight No.: BOA911
- Call sign: SPEEDBIRD 911
- Registration: G-APFE
- Flight origin: Heathrow Airport, London, United Kingdom
- 1st stopover: John F. Kennedy International Airport, New York City, New York, United States
- 2nd stopover: San Francisco International Airport, San Francisco, California, United States
- 3rd stopover: Honolulu International Airport, Honolulu, Hawaii, United States
- 4th stopover: Itazuke Air Base, Fukuoka, Japan (unscheduled)
- Last stopover: Haneda Airport, Tokyo, Japan
- Destination: Kai Tak Airport, British Hong Kong
- Occupants: 124
- Passengers: 113
- Crew: 11
- Fatalities: 124
- Survivors: 0

BOAC Flight 911 was a round-the-world flight operated by the British Overseas Airways Corporation (BOAC) that crashed near Mount Fuji in Japan on 5 March 1966, with the loss of all 113 passengers and 11 crew members. The Boeing 707 flying the route disintegrated mid-air shortly after departing from Tokyo Haneda Airport as a result of severe clear-air turbulence.

The crash of Flight 911 was the third fatal passenger airline accident in Tokyo in a month, following the crash of All Nippon Airways Flight 60 on 4 February and that of Canadian Pacific Air Lines Flight 402 just the day before.

== Background ==
=== Aircraft ===
Being manufactured in 1960, the aircraft operating the flight was a 6-year-old Boeing 707-436, registered as G-APFE. It was fitted with 4 Rolls-Royce Conway 508 engines. The aircraft had approximately 19,523 airframe hours.

=== Crew ===
The flight was under the command of Captain Bernard Dobson, aged 45; First Officer Edward Maloney, aged 33; Second Officer Terence Anderson, aged 33; and Flight Engineer Ian Carter, aged 31. Captain Dobson was described as a very experienced pilot who had been flying the Boeing 707 since 1960. He had accumulated 14,724 flight hours, of which 2,155 were in the 707. First Officer Maloney had accumulated 3,663 flight hours, of which 2,073 were in the 707. Second Officer Anderson had accumulated 3,906 flight hours, of which 2,538 were in the 707. Flight Engineer Carter had accumulated 4,748 flight hours, of which 1,773 were in the 707.

== Flight history ==
The accident aircraft, a Boeing 707 (registration G-APFE), arrived at Tokyo Haneda Airport at 12:40 on 5 March 1966. The plane had flown from Fukuoka Airport, where it had diverted the previous day due to weather conditions in Tokyo. The weather had since improved behind a cold front with a steep pressure gradient, bringing cool dry air from the Asian mainland on a strong west-northwest flow, with crystal-clear sky conditions.

For the next leg of Flight 911, which would take the plane to Kai Tak Airport in Hong Kong, the crew received a weather briefing from an airline representative, and filed an instrument flight rules (IFR) flight plan calling for a southbound departure from Haneda via the island of Izu Ōshima, then on airway JG6 to Hong Kong at flight level 310 (31,000 feet (9,400 m)). Eighty-nine passengers were from the United States, one crew member and 12 passengers were from Japan, nine crew members were from the United Kingdom, the remaining crew member and a passenger were from China, one each came from Canada and New Zealand while the nationalities for the nine remaining passengers are not known.

At 13:42, Flight 911's crew contacted Tokyo air traffic control (ATC) requesting permission to start the engines and amending their clearance request to a visual meteorological conditions (VMC) climb westbound via the Fuji-Rebel-Kushimoto waypoints, which would take them nearer to Mount Fuji, possibly to give the passengers a better view of the landmark. The aircraft began taxiing at 13:50 and took off into the northwest wind at 13:58. After takeoff, the aircraft made a continuous climbing right turn over Tokyo Bay and rolled out on a southwest heading, passing north of Odawara. It then turned right again toward Mount Fuji, flying over Gotemba on a heading of approximately 298°, at an indicated airspeed of 320 to 370 knots (590 to 690 km/h; 370 to 430 mph) and an altitude of approximately 16,000 feet (4,900 m), well above the 12,388 ft (3,776 m) mountain peak. The aircraft then encountered strong turbulence, causing it to break up in flight and crash into a forest.

== Investigation ==
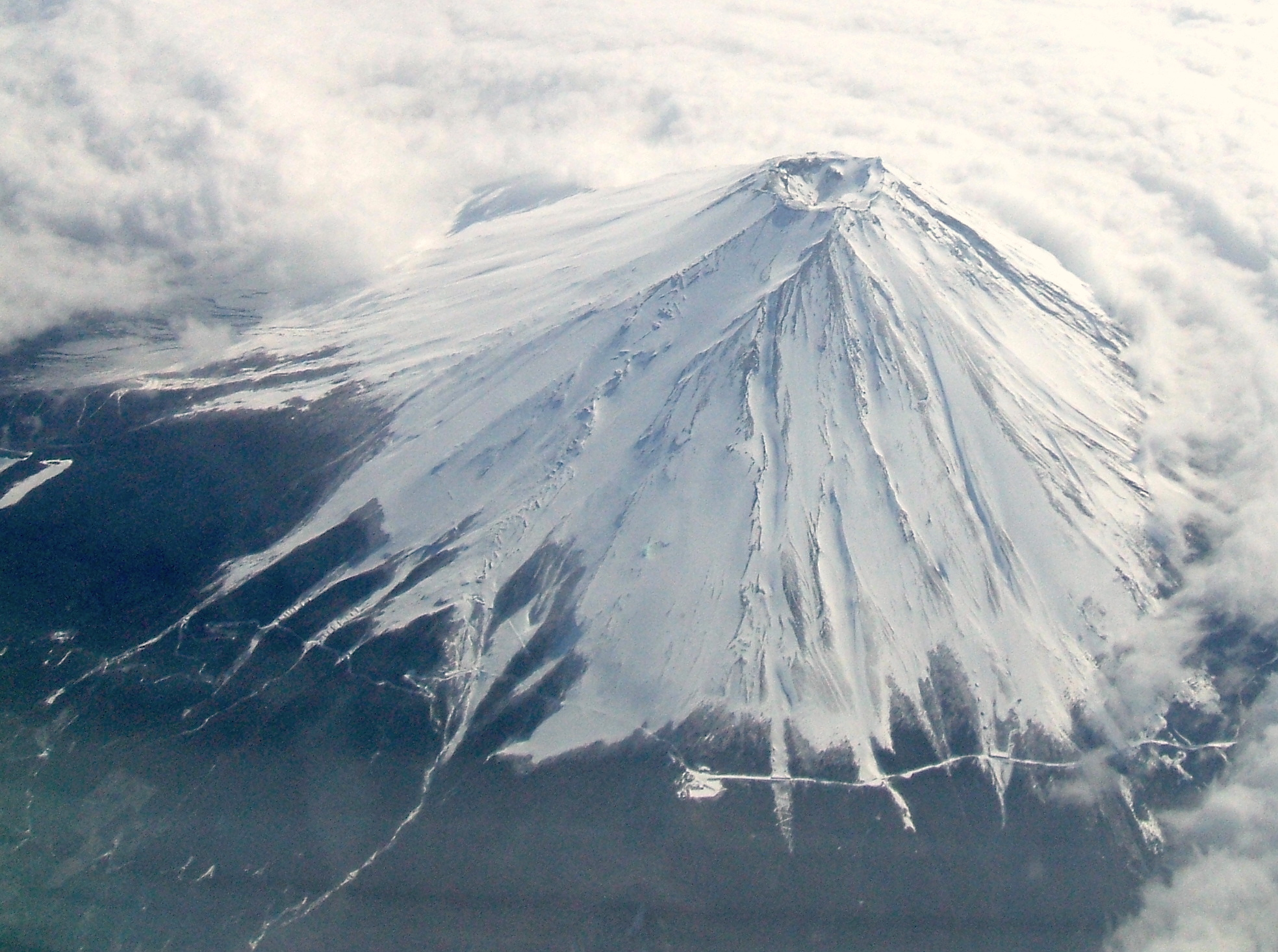
Mount Fuji seen from the air

Flight 911 left a debris field 16 kilometres (9.9 mi; 8.6 nmi) long. Analysis of the location of wreckage allowed accident investigators to determine that the vertical stabiliser attachment to the fuselage failed first. The vertical stabiliser left paint marks indicating that it broke off the port side horizontal stabiliser as it departed to the left and down. A short time later, the ventral fin and all four engine pylons failed due to a leftward over-stress, shortly followed by the remainder of the empennage. The aircraft then entered a flat spin, with the forward fuselage section and the outer starboard wing breaking off shortly before impact with the ground.

An 8 mm film exposed by one of the passengers was recovered from the wreckage. It showed pictures of the Tanzawa Mountains and Lake Yamanaka, followed by two empty frames and then apparently images of the aircraft's interior, before ending abruptly. Tests suggested that the two empty frames may have been the result of structural loads of up to 7.5 g momentarily jamming the camera's feeding mechanism.

Although some stress cracking was found in the vertical stabiliser bolt holes, it was determined by subsequent testing that it did not contribute to the structural failure. Still, it was potentially a significant flight safety issue. Subsequent inspections on Boeing 707 and similar Boeing 720 aircraft as a result of this discovery did reveal this was a common problem, and corrective maintenance actions on the fleet eventually followed.

One day after the crash, speculation was that fierce winds above Mount Fuji were responsible. The New York Times wrote that, despite initial reports of fire and explosion, aviation experts were of the opinion that wind conditions around the volcanic cone may have caused the crash, the vicinity of the peak being notorious for its difficult air currents. The violent forces exerted by the turbulent air could have caused the structural failure of one of the engines, leading to a subsequent fire.

The investigation report concluded that the aircraft crashed as a result of its encounter with "abnormally severe turbulence over Gotemba City which imposed a gust load considerably in excess of the design limit." It also stated "it is not unreasonable to assume that, on the day of the accident, powerful mountain waves existed in the lee of Mt Fuji, as in the case of mountain waves formed by extended ridges, and that the breakdown of the waves resulted in small-scale turbulence, the intensity of which might have become severe or extreme in a short period of time."

== Aftermath ==
This accident was one of five fatal aircraft disasters in Japan in 1966, and occurred less than 24 hours after Canadian Pacific Air Lines Flight 402 crashed and burned on landing at Haneda. Film footage shows Flight 911 taxiing past the still-smoldering wreckage of Flight 402 immediately before taking off for the last time. The combined effect of these five accidents shook public confidence in commercial aviation in Japan, and the reduced demand forced both Japan Air Lines and All Nippon Airways to cut back some domestic service.

== Victims ==
The victims included a group of 75 Americans associated with the Thermo King company of Minneapolis, Minnesota, on a two-week company-sponsored tour of Japan and Southeast Asia. There were 26 couples traveling together in the group, and a total of 63 children were orphaned as a result of the accident.

The victims also included actor and dancer Sonne Teal and four other female impersonators of Le Carrousel de Paris (reported to be named Kismie, Coco, Christine and Lady Cobra), who were performing on an international tour.

Several booked passengers cancelled their tickets at the last moment to see a ninja demonstration. These passengers—Albert R. Broccoli, Harry Saltzman, Ken Adam, Lewis Gilbert and Freddie Young—were in Japan scouting locations for the fifth James Bond film, You Only Live Twice (1967).
