= Asbjørn Andersen =

Asbjørn Andersen may refer to:

- Asbjørn Andersen (actor) (1903–1978), Danish film actor and director
- Asbjørn Andersen (footballer) (1922–1970), Norwegian footballer
- Asbjørn Andersen (politician) (1941–1994), Norwegian politician
- Asbjørn Kragh Andersen (born 1992), Danish cyclist
