= Fritz Andersen =

Danish organist and composer

Johannes Fritz Emanuel Andersen (14 February 1829 – 1910) was a Danish organist and composer. He was the father of critic Sophus Andersen.
