= Karin Andreassen =

Norwegian marine geologist and geophysicist

Karin Marie Andreassen is a retired Norwegian marine geologist and marine geophysicist, formerly a professor in the Department of Geosciences of The Arctic University of Norway in Tromsø and director of the Centre for Arctic Gas Hydrate, Environment, and Climate. Her research has concerned the effects of past ice ages and their following warming periods on the seabed and continental margin of the Arctic Ocean and Barents Sea, including the effects of glaciation and warming on the stability of undersea methane clathrate deposits and the craters formed by clathrate blowouts.

Andreassen has a Ph.D. from The Arctic University of Norway. The university's Centre for Arctic Gas Hydrate, Environment, and Climate was an ongoing project from 2013 to 2023; she helped found it as its assistant director, and succeeded Jürgen Mienert as its director in 2017.

Andreassen was elected to the Norwegian Academy of Science and Letters in 2018. The Geological Society of Norway gave Andreassen the Brøgger Prize, a lifetime achievement award of the society, in 2021.
