= Andreessen =

Andreessen is a German patronymic surname ("son of Andreas"), which may refer to:

People:

- Willy Andreessen (1895-1935), National Socialist official, Gauamtsleiter of the National Socialist Factory Cell Organization (NSBO).
- Marc Andreessen (born 1971), American venture capitalist and software engineer
- Laura Arrillaga-Andreessen, American philanthropist, wife of Marc Andreessen
- Joe Andreessen (born 2000), American professional football linebacker for the Buffalo Bills

Company:

- Andreessen Horowitz, venture capital firm founded in 2009 by Marc Andreessen and Ben Horowitz

== See also ==
- Andriessen
- Andreassen
- Andreasson
- Andresen
- Andersen
