= Elisabeth Andersen =

Dutch actress (1920–2018)

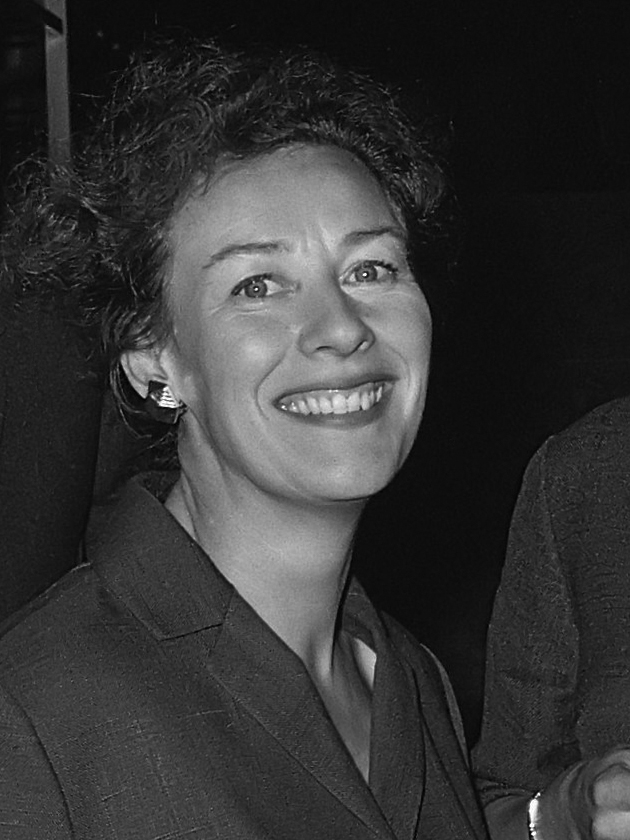
- Andersen in 1965
- Born: Anna Elisabeth de Bruijn; 1 January 1920; The Hague, South Holland
- Died: 3 October 2018 (aged 98); Haarlem, North Holland
- Occupation: Actress
- Spouse: Jan Retèl (m. 1948–1954)
- Children: 2
- Awards: Theo d'Or (1958, 1966, 1984); Knight of the Order of Orange-Nassau (1968)

Anna Elisabeth de Bruijn (1 January 1920 – 3 October 2018), better known by the stage name of Elisabeth Andersen, was a Dutch actress, primarily in theatre. She was a three-time recipient of the Theo d'Or.

== Career ==
Born in The Hague, Andersen attended drama school in Amsterdam from 1941 to 1943, but did not complete her studies. From 1947 to 1974, she frequently appeared onstage for the Hague Comedy.

== Awards ==
Andersen was a three-time recipient of the Theo d'Or Award (1958, 1966, 1984), the most for any Dutch stage actress. In 1968, she was honored as Knight of the Order of Orange-Nassau.

== Personal life ==
Andersen was married to actor Jan Retèl from 1948 to 1954 and had two children. She died in Haarlem on 3 October 2018 at age 98.
