= Andreson (footballer) =

Brazilian footballer (born 1985)

Personal information
- Full name: Andreson Dourado Ribas
- Date of birth: 23 April 1985 (age 41)
- Place of birth: Miguel Calmon, Bahia, Brazil
- Height: 1.84 m (6 ft 0 in)
- Position: Midfielder

Youth career
- Pão de Açúcar EC

Senior career*
Years	Team	Apps	(Gls)
2006	Juventus-SP		
2007	Vilnius	20	(1)
2007–2008	ŁKS Łódź	8	(0)
2008	→ Stal Głowno (loan)	1	(0)
2008–2010	Pão de Açúcar		(1+)
2011	Sport Barueri		
2012	Osvaldo Cruz		
2015	Comercial	8	(2)
2016	Monte Carlo		
2017	Comercial		
2018	Novoperário		
2019	Jacobina		
2020	Doce Mel		
2021	Fluminense de Feira		
2021	Botafogo SC		
2022	Barcelona FC		
2022	Jacobinense		
- * Club domestic league appearances and goals as of 23 April 2024

Andreson Dourado Ribas (born 23 April 1985), commonly known as Andreson, is a Brazilian footballer who plays as a midfielder.
