= Anderiesen =

Anderiesen is a Dutch patronymic surname (son of Andries). Notable people with the surname include:

- Henk Anderiesen (1898–1980), Dutch footballer
- Wim Anderiesen Sr. (1903–1944), Dutch footballer
- Wim Anderiesen Jr. (1931–2017), Dutch footballer

== See also ==
- Andriessen
