= Laura Andreson =

American ceramic artist and educator

- Andreson unloading a kiln, c. 1962
- Born: 1902; San Bernardino, California
- Died: August 16, 1999 (aged 96–97); Los Angeles, California
- Education: University of California, Los Angeles, Columbia University
- Known for: Ceramics

Laura Andreson (1902 San Bernardino – August 16, 1999 Los Angeles) was an American ceramic artist and educator at University of California Los Angeles.

== Life and career ==
Andreson graduated from the University of California, Los Angeles summa cum laude in 1932 with a bachelor's degree in education. She completed her MFA at Columbia University in 1937 through an intensive summer program. Andreson taught in the art department at University of California, Los Angeles from 1933 to 1970. She founded the ceramics program at the university in 1933 through the art education department. This program was one of the first of its kind in the United States and the first in the American West. Andreson was a major influence on the ceramics in the United States during the twentieth century. When Andreson began her career, there was little technical information available, leading to a lifelong commitment to experimentation with glazes and clays. Andreson is credited with developing new glaze technologies and firing techniques. Andreson found critical success early in her career. In 1937 she exhibited at the Rena Rosenthal Gallery in New York and in 1940 had an exhibition of her work at the Honolulu Academy of Art. In 1946, the Museum of Modern Art bought a piece of her work for their permanent collection; this was one of the first craft pieces made by a living artists purchased for the museum's collection. Andreson is credited with teaching more than 5,000 students while at UCLA.

In her early career, Andreson worked primarily in low-fire earthenware, which she slab built and slip cast. She learned to throw on the potter's wheel in 1944 from F. Carlton Ball at Mills College and Gertrude Natzler in Los Angeles. An accidental reduction firing in her Denver Kiln in 1948 lead to her beginning to work in stoneware. In 1957, Andreson began working in porcelain, which previously had been used primarily in commercial production in the United States. By the end of the decade, she had become the West Coast expert on porcelain among studio potters. Porcelain was her primary medium for the remainder of her career. Her production was deeply influenced by travels to Scandinavia and East Asia.

Laura Andreson's creative process differed radically from other potters. Instead of starting with the creation of the vessel form, Andreson began with glazes and then decided what kind of form was best suited for the glaze.

Her papers are held at the Archives of American Art.

Andreson's work can be found in the Metropolitan Museum of Art, the Museum of Modern Art, Museum of Fine Arts, Boston, the Everson Museum of Art, Smithsonian Museum of American Art, Los Angeles County Museum of Art, the Walker Art Center, and the Nora Eccles Harrison Museum of Art. Her work, Bowl, was acquired by the Smithsonian American Art Museum as part of the Renwick Gallery's 50th Anniversary Campaign.
