= Andresen =

Andresen and the parallel form Andreasen (Norwegian cognate Andreassen) are Danish-Norwegian patronymic surnames meaning "son of Andreas". It has a similar origin as the name Andersen. It may refer to:

- Alexandra Andresen (born 1996), Norwegian heiress, world's youngest billionaire
- August H. Andresen (1890–1958), American politician
- Björn Andrésen (1955–2025), Swedish actor and musician
- Frode Andresen (born 1973), Norwegian biathlete
- Ivar F. Andresen (1896–1940), Norwegian operatic singer
- Martin Andresen (born 1977), Norwegian footballer
- Momme Andresen (1857–1951), German industrial chemist who invented the photographic developer "Rodinal"
- Nicolay August Andresen (1812–1894), Norwegian banker
- Rasmus Andresen (born 1986), German politician
- Sophia de Mello Breyner Andresen (1919–2004), Portuguese poet

Also:

- Andresen v. Maryland, U.S. law case

== See also ==
- Andreasen
- Andersen
- Andreessen (disambiguation)
- Andriessen
- Andreassen
- Andreasson
