= Mikkel Andersen =

Mikkel Andersen may refer to:

- Mikkel Andersen (footballer) (born 1988), Danish football goalkeeper
- Mikkel Andersen (physicist), physicist in New Zealand
- Mikkel B. Andersen (born 1998), Danish speedway rider
- Mikkel Andersen (born 2008), Danish speedway rider
