= Sophus Andersen =

Danish musician

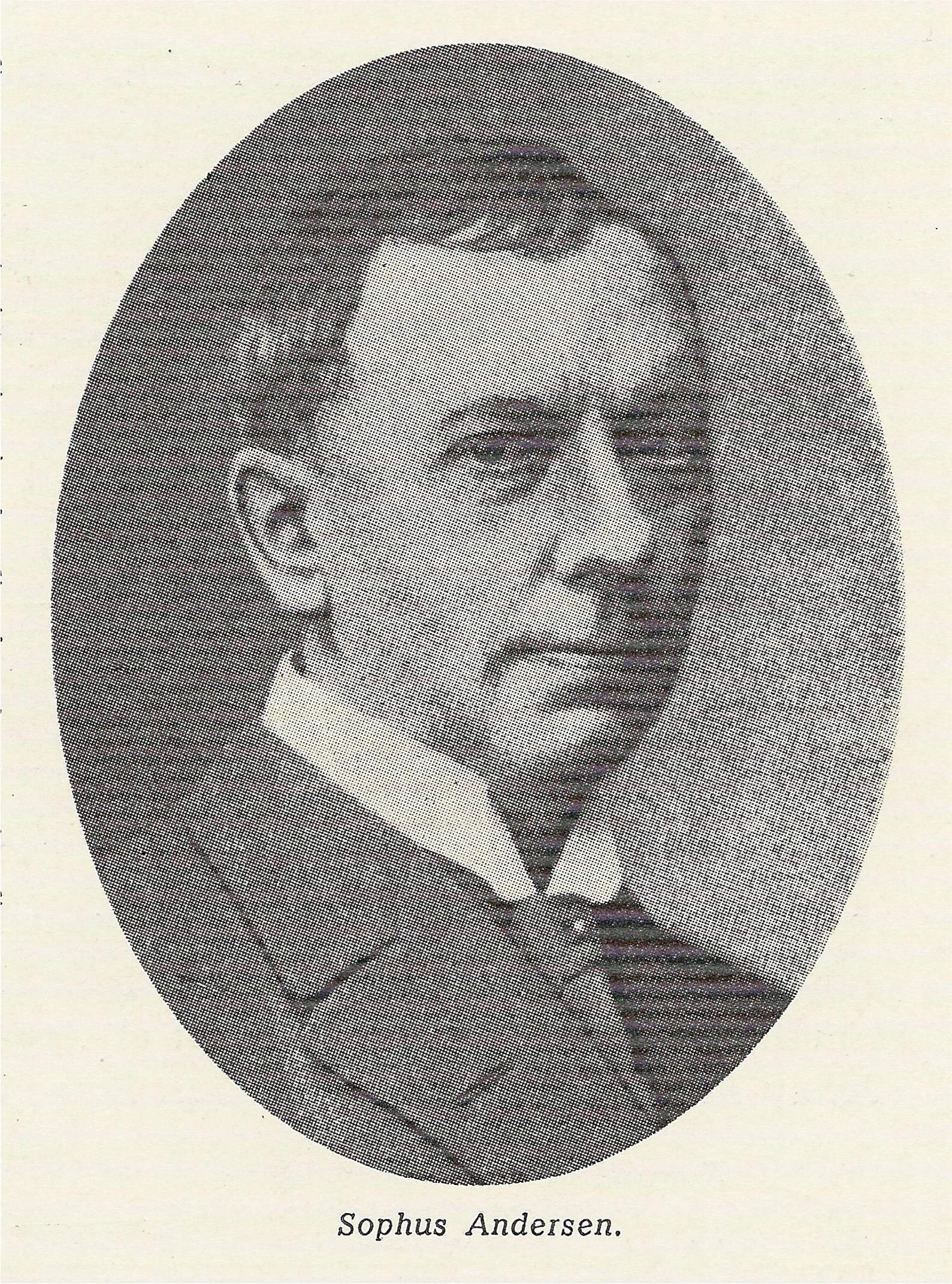
Sophus Andersen.

Sophus Andersen (8 December 1859 – 19 September 1923) was a Danish composer and music critic.

== Biography ==
Sophus Emil Andersen was born in Copenhagen.

He was the son of composer Fritz Andersen (1829–1910). He studied both piano and violin in his youth. He studied composition with composer Thorvald Hansen (1847–1915). In 1890 he graduated and worked for some years as a teacher. From 1892 he was a music critic at the Copenhagen newspaper København .
