= All Nippon Airways Flight 533 =

1966 aviation accident

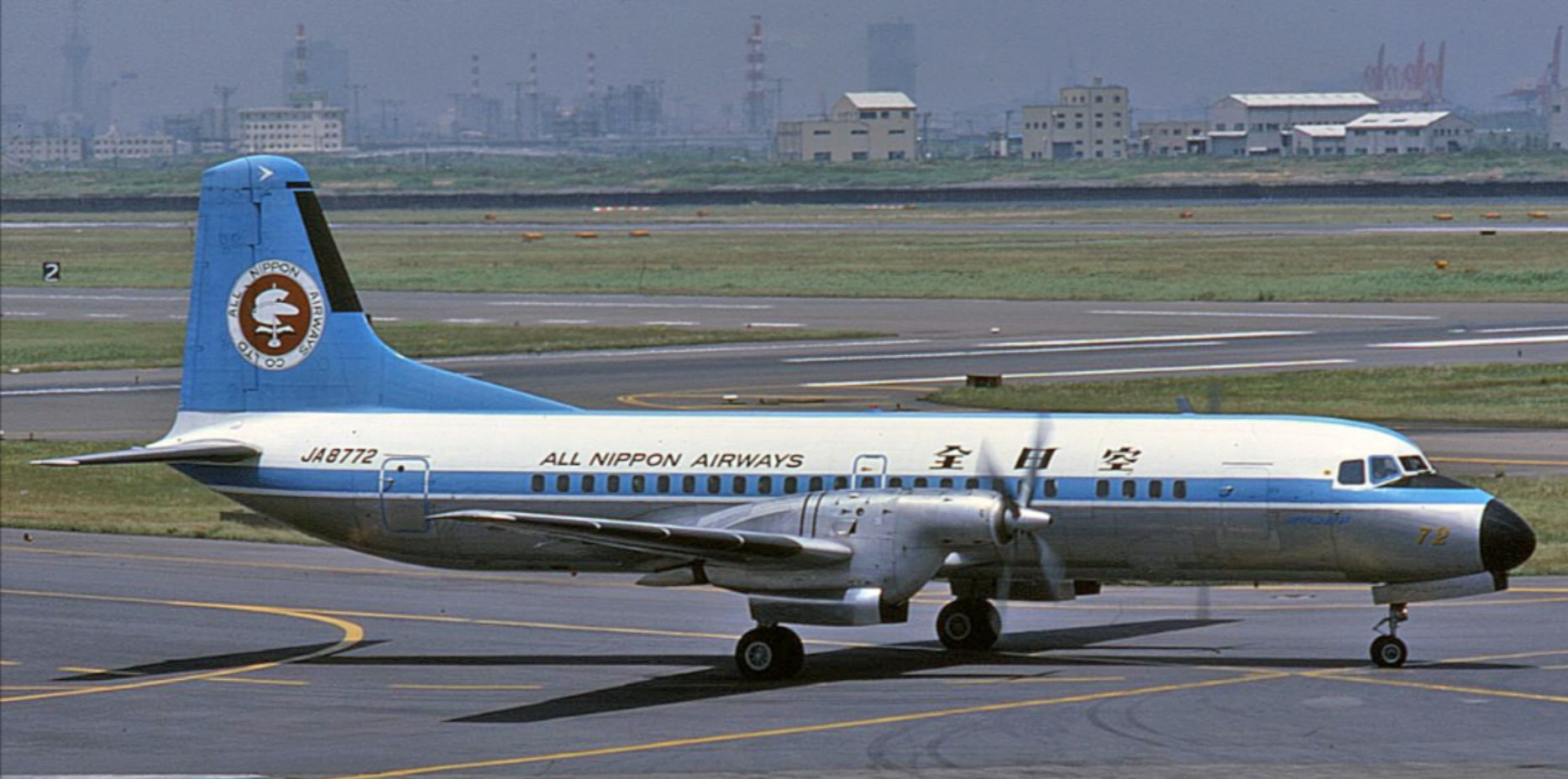
- An NAMC YS-11 of All Nippon Airways, similar to the accident aircraft

Accident
- Date: November 13, 1966
- Summary: Crashed due to undetermined reasons
- Site: Seto Inland Sea off Matsuyama Airport, Matsuyama; 33.8349°N 132.6829°E

Aircraft
- Aircraft type: NAMC YS-11-111
- Operator: All Nippon Airways
- IATA flight No.: NH533
- ICAO flight No.: ANA533
- Call sign: ALL NIPPON 533
- Registration: JA8658
- Flight origin: Osaka International Airport
- Destination: Matsuyama Airport
- Occupants: 50
- Passengers: 45
- Crew: 5
- Fatalities: 50
- Survivors: 0

All Nippon Airways Flight 533, registration JA8658, was a NAMC YS-11 en route from Osaka, Japan, to Matsuyama on the island of Shikoku. It was the fifth crash in Japan in 1966 and the second one experienced by All Nippon Airways that year, the first being the loss of Flight 60 on February 4. It was also, at the time, the deadliest crash of an NAMC YS-11, and remains the second-deadliest after Toa Domestic Airlines Flight 63, which crashed in 1971 with 68 deaths.

The plane left Osaka International Airport in Itami at 19:13. At approximately 20:20 it was approaching towards Matsuyama Airport and was cleared to land on runway 31. On its final approach, the plane was higher than normal and touched down 460 metres beyond the runway threshold. The plane continued on the ground for 170 metres before taking off again for a go-around. The plane reached a height of 70–100 metres, turned left, lost altitude, and crashed into the Seto Inland Sea at approximately 20:30. The cause of the crash was never determined.

As of 2024, Flight 533 continues to operate, but now it flies from Haneda to Takamatsu, utilizing an Airbus A321neo aircraft.
