= Johannes Andersen (musician) =

Danish hornist and composer

Johannes Andersen (1890–1980) was a Danish hornist and composer. He wrote a number of pieces for orchestra, as well as a handful of chamber works.
