= Aksel Andersen =

Danish organist and composer (1912–1977)

Hans Aksel Andersen (19 March 1912 – 18 November 1977) was a Danish classical organist, composer and professor of music.

Aksel Andersen was born in Ruskin, Nebraska. As a boy he was trained in organ, violin and piano. In Denmark, he was a pupil in Varde under Svend-Ove Møller (1903–1949), organist at Viborg Cathedral. As a 12-year-old, he succeeded him as organist. He was also taught by Thorvald Aagaard. Andersen would later become an exam organist at the Royal Danish Academy of Music in 1931. Andersen was one of the forces behind the organ concerts at Løgumkloster Church (Løgumkloster kirkes koncerter). He died in Vedbæk in 1977.

== Note ==
- This article was initially translated from the Danish Wikipedia.
