= Andreasson BA-4B =

BA-4B
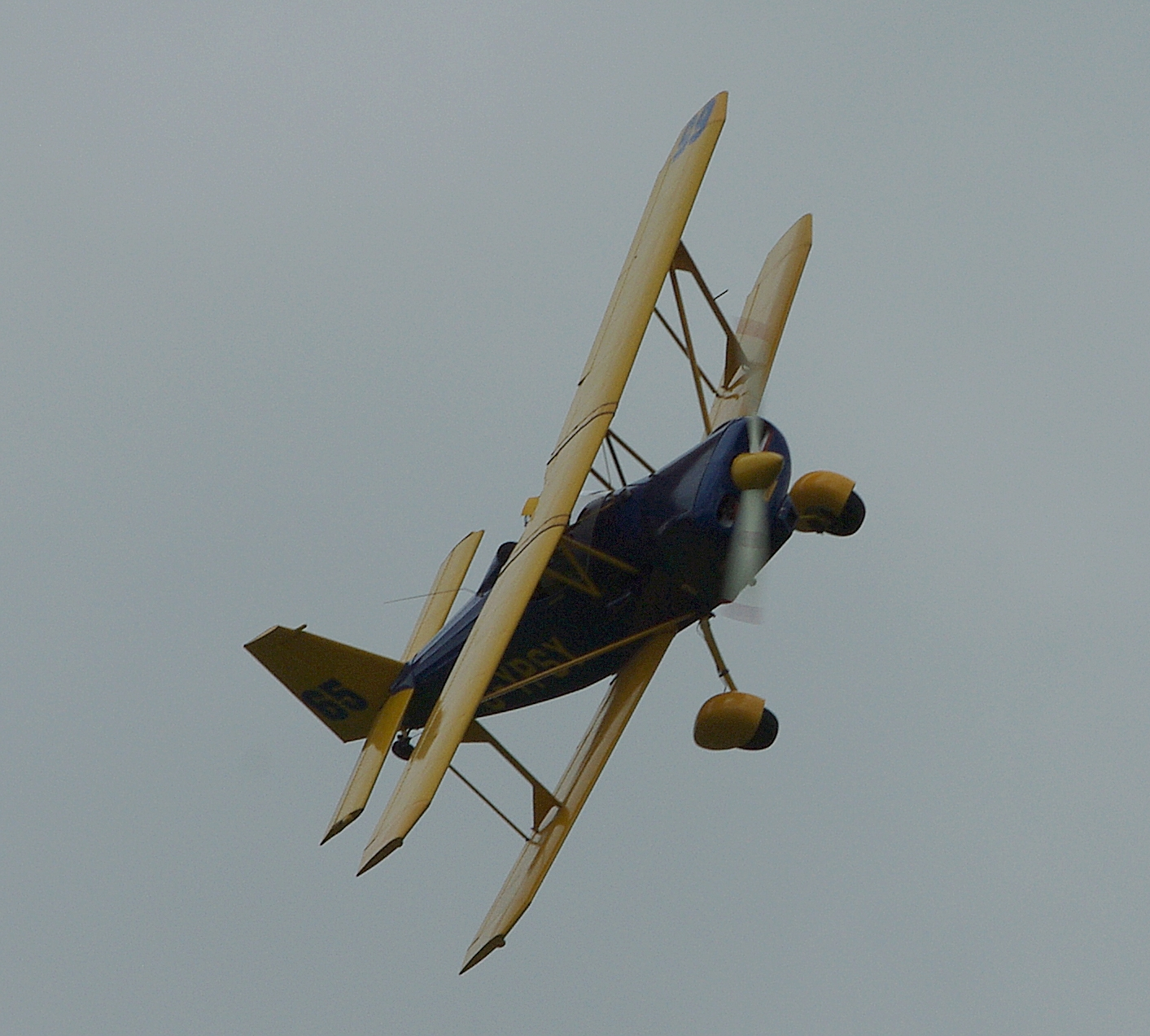

General information
- Type: Sports biplane
- Manufacturer: Homebuilt
- Designer: Björn Andreasson

History
- First flight: 1966
- Developed from: Andreasson BA-4
- Developed into: Andreasson BA-11

The Andreasson BA-4B is a single-seat aerobatic biplane which was marketed for homebuilding and also produced complete.

== Design and development ==
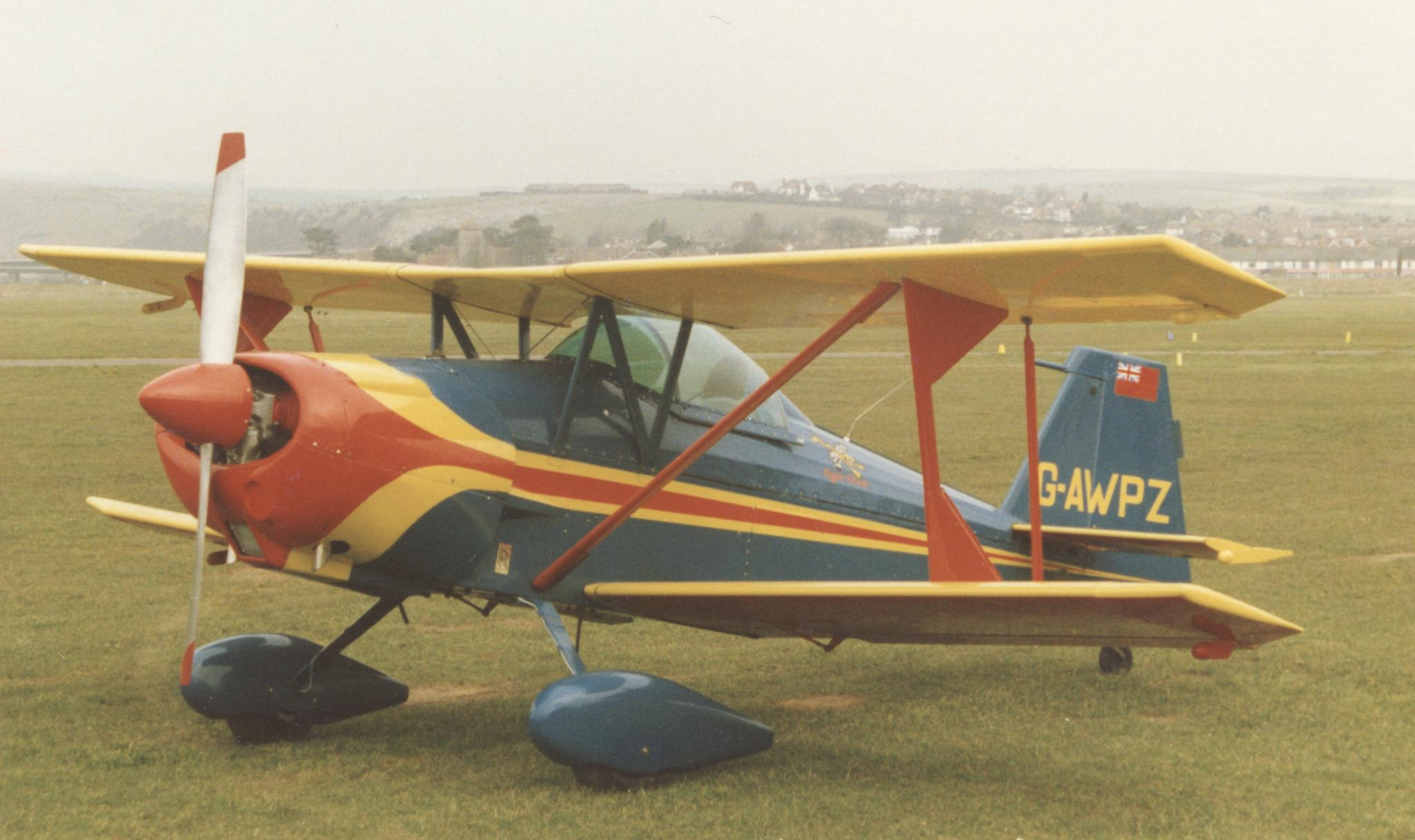
Swedish-built first prototype BA-4B at Shoreham Airport, England, in February 1988

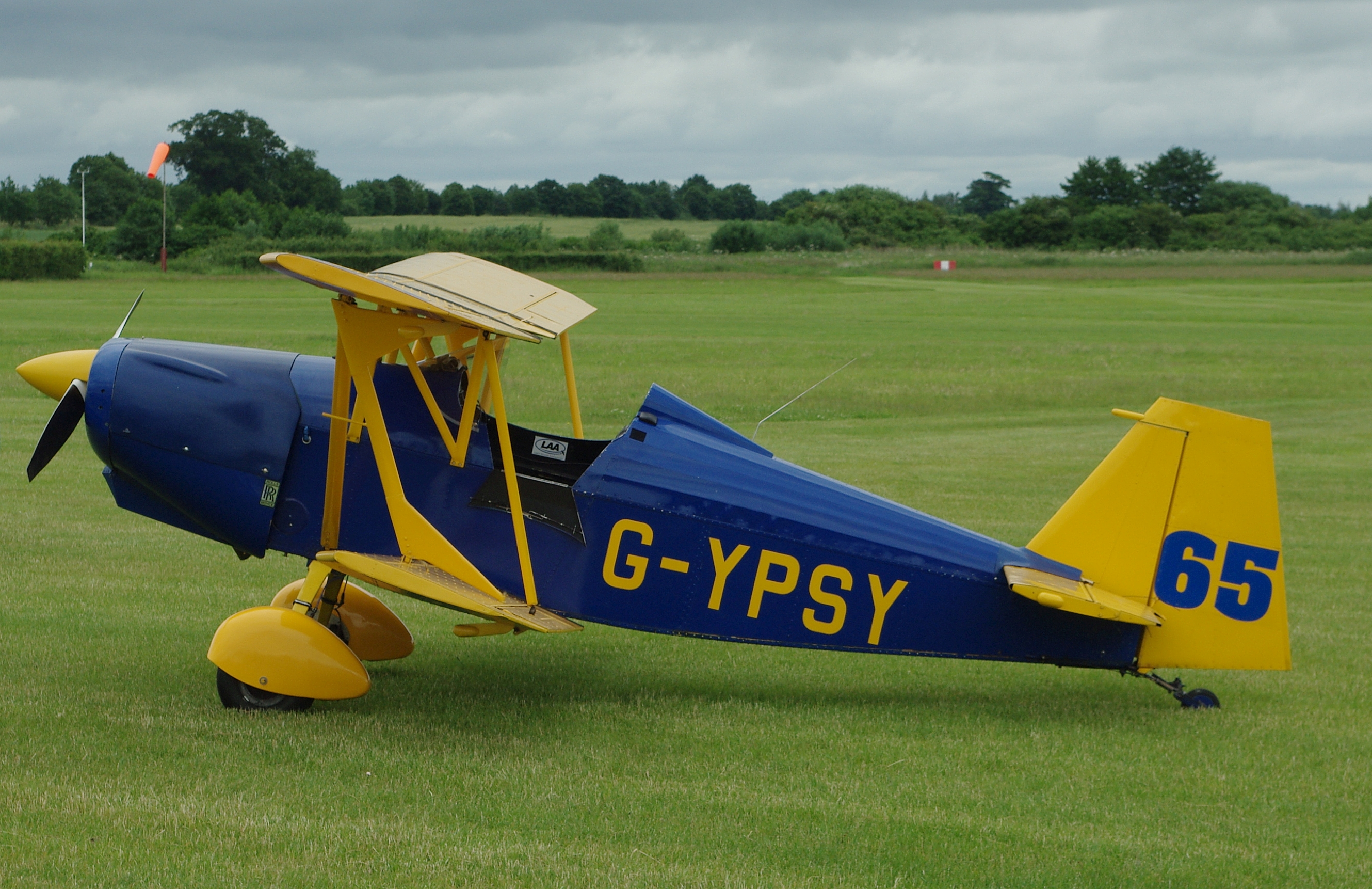
At Old Warden, June 2014

The BA-B4B was based on Andreasson's 1944 wooden BA-4 revised to take advantage of more modern construction techniques, such as the use of sheet metal. The first example was built by apprentices at the Malmö Aircraft Industry (M.F.I.). It is a single-bay, staggered-wing biplane with fixed tailwheel undercarriage. P.J.C Phillips acquired worldwide production rights for complete, rather than kit built, version and marketed them in the UK through Crosby Aviation. In the US the B-4B was marketed by Larry Karp as the Canary Hawk.

== Operational history ==
In 2014 there were six BA-4Bs on the UK civil register, one Crosby built and the others homebuilt. Three of these have the Continental O-200-A engine but the other three use Lycoming flat fours with outputs between 81 kW (108 hp) and 119 kW (160 hp). In 2009 four BA-4Bs remained on the Swedish register.

== Variants ==
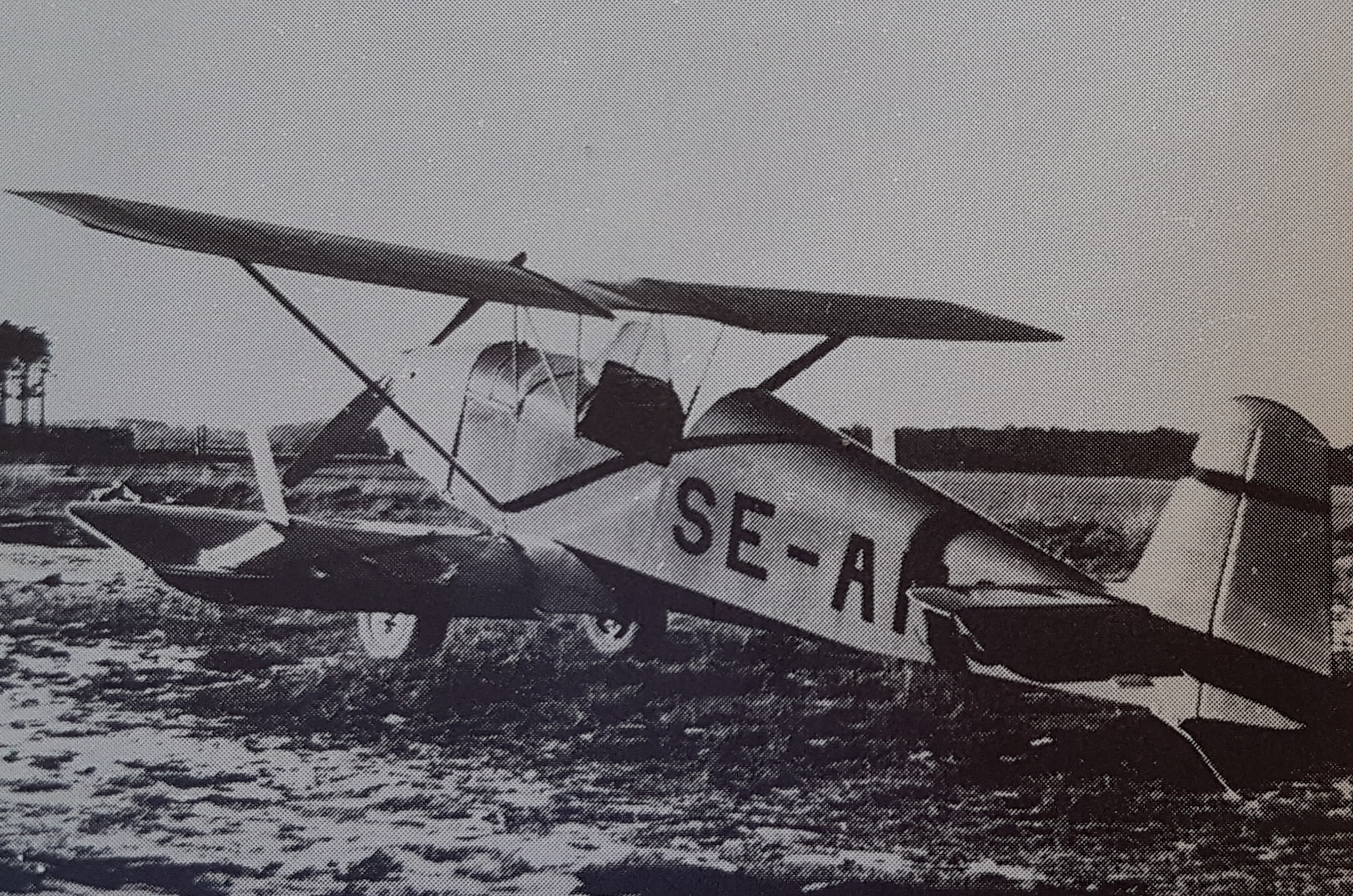
Ba-4 Midget

Andeasson B-4 (Midget)
Wood and fabric biplane first flown in 1944, powered by a 21 kW (28 hp) Scott Squirrel.
Andreasson B-4B
All-metal version. First prototype built by M.F.I apprentices in c.1964. Plans marketed.
Crosby (Andreasson) B-4B
Sold complete, powered by a 75 kW (100 hp) Rolls-Royce Continental O-200-A flat four.
Crosby (Andreasson) Super B-4B
As B-4B but with a 89 kW (120 hp) Rolls-Royce Continental O-240-A flat four.

== Specifications (Crosby (Andreasson) BA-4B) ==
Data from Jane's All the World's Aircraft 1974/5

General characteristics

- Crew: One
- Length: 4.67 m (15 ft 4 in)
- Wingspan: 5.64 m (18 ft 6 in)
- Wing area: 8.36 m^{2} (90.0 sq ft)
- Empty weight: 295 kg (650 lb)
- Max takeoff weight: 460 kg (1,014 lb)
- Fuel capacity: 56.3 L (12.4 imp gal; 14.9 US gal) internal. Provision for external tank holding extra 50 L (11.0 imp gal; 13.2 US gal)
- Powerplant: 1 × Rolls-Royce Continental O-200-A flat four, 75 kW (100 hp)
- Propellers: 2

Performance

- Maximum speed: 241 km/h (150 mph, 130 kn) level flight, sea level
- Cruise speed: 217 km/h (135 mph, 117 kn) 75% power at 2,134 m (7,000 ft)
- Stall speed: 73 km/h (45 mph, 39 kn) power on
- Range: 573 km (356 mi, 309 nmi) standard fuel, 75% power
- Rate of climb: 6.1 m/s (1,200 ft/min) maximum at sea level
- Wing loading: 54.7 kg/m^{2} (11.2 lb/sq ft)

== See also ==
Related development

- BA-11
