= Bobst =

Bobst may refer to:

- Elmer Holmes Bobst Library (a.k.a. "Bobst"), the main library at New York University in Manhattan, New York City, New York State, USA
- Bobst SA, a Swiss packaging machinery and servicing company
- Elmer Holmes Bobst (1884–1978), a U.S. businessman and philanthropist

== See also ==
- Bobst Boy, nickname of Steven Stanzak (born 1984), NYU student who was found living in the basement of the Bobst
