= Alice Anderson (disambiguation) =

Alice Anderson (born 1972) is a French artist.

Alice Anderson may also refer to:

- Alice Anderson, one of the Breck Girls, advertising Breck Shampoo
- Alice Anderson, character in the online sports game FreeStyle Street Basketball
- Alice Anderson (writer) (born 1966), American poet
- Alice Elizabeth Anderson (1897–1926), Australian mechanic and garage proprietor
- Alice Skye, née Alice Anderson, Australian singer-songwriter

== See also ==
- Anderson (disambiguation)
