= Courant Institute School of Mathematics, Computing, and Data Science =

Division of New York University, US (founded 1935)

Coordinates: 40.72858°N 73.99552°W

- Former name: Courant Institute of Mathematical Sciences (1935–2025)
- Type: Private
- Established: 1935
- Founder: Richard Courant
- Parent institution: New York University
- Dean: Denis Zorin
- Location: 251 Mercer St, New York City, New York, 10012, USA
- Website: cims.nyu.edu

The Courant Institute School of Mathematics, Computing, and Data Science, previously known as the Courant Institute of Mathematical Sciences (CIMS), is a constituent school of New York University.

Founded in 1935 as the Courant Institute of Mathematical Sciences, the school is named after Richard Courant, who was one of its founders and mathematics professors from 1936 to 1972. The Mathematics Department is housed in Warren Weaver Hall on Gould Plaza.

On November 13, 2025, New York University announced the creation of the Courant Institute School of Mathematics, Computing and Data Science. The new school includes the university's Department of Mathematics, the Center for Data Science, and an expanded Department of Computer Science now linked with the Department of Computer Science and Engineering at the Tandon School of Engineering.

== History ==
In 1934, Richard Courant left Göttingen University in Germany to become a visiting professor at NYU. He was given the task of building up the Department of Mathematics at the NYU Graduate School of Arts and Science. He was later joined by Kurt O. Friedrichs and James J. Stoker. In 1946, the department was renamed "Institute for Mathematics and Mechanics". Also in 1946, NYU Professor Morris Kline focused on mathematical problems of electromagnetic wave propagation. This project gave rise to the institute's Division of Wave Propagation and Applied Mathematics. In 1952, the United States Atomic Energy Commission installed one of the first (electronic) computers at New York University, which led to the creation of the Courant Mathematics and Computing Laboratory. The Division of Magnetofluid Dynamics was initiated by a project on plasma fusion by NYU Professor Harold Grad in 1954. The institute was in the forefront of advanced hardware use, with an early IBM 7094 and the fourth produced CDC 6600. The Division of Computational Fluid Dynamics was created in 1978, arising from a project of NYU Professor Paul R. Garabedian.

The director of the Courant Institute directly reports to New York University's provost and president and works closely with deans and directors of other NYU colleges and divisions respectively. The undergraduate programs and graduate programs at the Courant Institute are run independently by the institute, and formally associated with the NYU College of Arts and Science, NYU Tandon School of Engineering, and NYU Graduate School of Arts and Science, respectively.

On November 13, 2025, president of New York University Linda G. Mills announced that the Courant Institute would become a new school within the university. The Courant Institute School of Mathematics, Computing, and Data Science includes the university's Department of Mathematics, the Center for Data Science, and an expanded Department of Computer Science now linked with the Department of Computer Science and Engineering at the Tandon School of Engineering. The decision to create a new school was based on consultations with faculty-led committees. The university's announcement confirmed that Mathematics professor Gérard Ben Arous would serve as the new school's inaugural dean until the search for a permanent dean was completed. In August 2026, it was announced that Denis Zorin will serve as Dean of Courant.

== Academics ==
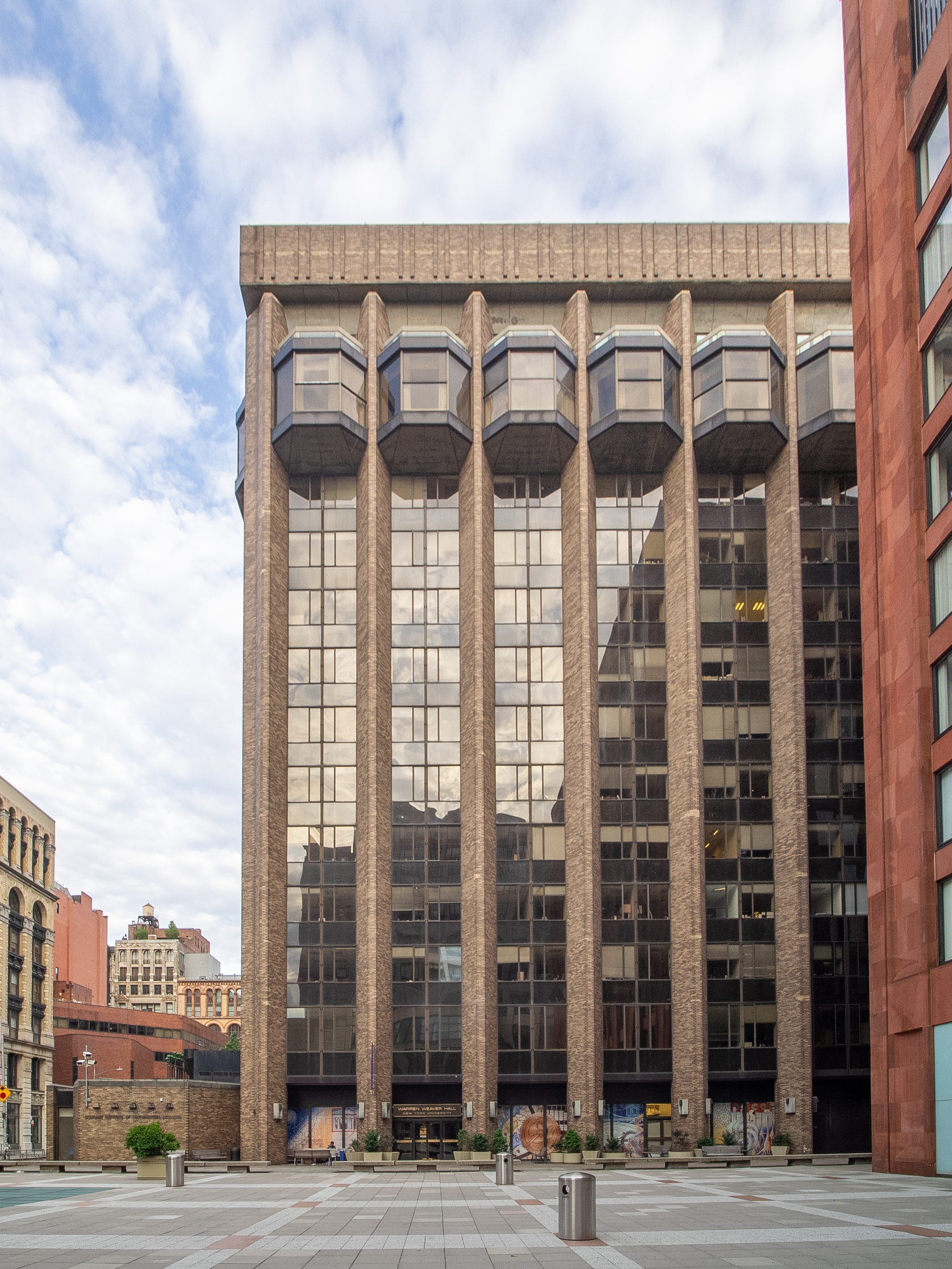
View of Warren Weaver Hall, Courant Institute of Mathematical Sciences from Gould Plaza

=== Rankings ===
The Courant Institute specializes in applied mathematics, mathematical analysis and scientific computation. There is emphasis on partial differential equations and their applications. The mathematics department is consistently ranked in the United States as #1 in applied mathematics. Other strong points are Analysis (#6 as of 2022) and geometry (#12 as of 2022). Within the field of computer science, CIMS concentrates in machine learning, theory, programming languages, computer graphics and parallel computing. In 2022, the computer science program was ranked #19 among computer science and information systems programs globally. In 2022, the Academic Ranking of World Universities placed the Courant Institute as #9 worldwide in the subject ranking for mathematics.

Six (at the time of award) faculty members have been awarded the National Medal of Science (Kurt O. Friedrichs, Peter Lax, Cathleen Synge Morawetz, Louis Nirenberg, Charles S. Peskin, S. R. Srinivasa Varadhan), one (Mikhail Gromov) was honored with the Kyoto Prize, and nine have received career awards from the National Science Foundation. Courant Institute professors Lax, Varadhan, Gromov, Nirenberg won the 2005, 2007, 2009 and 2015 Abel Prize respectively for their research in partial differential equations, probability and geometry. Louis Nirenberg also received the Chern Medal in 2010, and Subhash Khot won the Nevanlinna Prize in 2014. Amir Pnueli and Yann LeCun won the 1996 and 2018 Turing Award respectively. In addition, Jeff Cheeger was also awarded the Shaw Prize in Mathematical Sciences in 2021.

=== Admissions ===
The Courant Institute offers Bachelor of Arts, Bachelor of Science, Master of Science and PhD degree programs in both mathematics and computer science with program acceptance rates ranging from 3% to 29%. The overall acceptance rate for all CIMS graduate programs is 15%, and program admissions reviews are holistic. A high undergraduate GPA and high GRE score are typically prerequisites to admission to its graduate programs but are not required. Majority of accepted candidates met these standards. However, character and personal qualities and evidence of strong quantitative skills are very important admission factors. Consistent with its scientific breadth, the institute welcomes applicants whose primary background is in quantitative fields such as economics, engineering, physics, or biology, as well as mathematics. Undergraduate program admissions are not directly administrated by the institute but by the NYU undergraduate admissions office of College of Arts and Science.

=== Graduate program ===
The Department of Mathematics at the Courant Institute offers PhDs in Mathematics, Atmosphere-Ocean Science, and Computational Biology; Masters of Science in Mathematical Finance, Mathematics, and Scientific Computing.

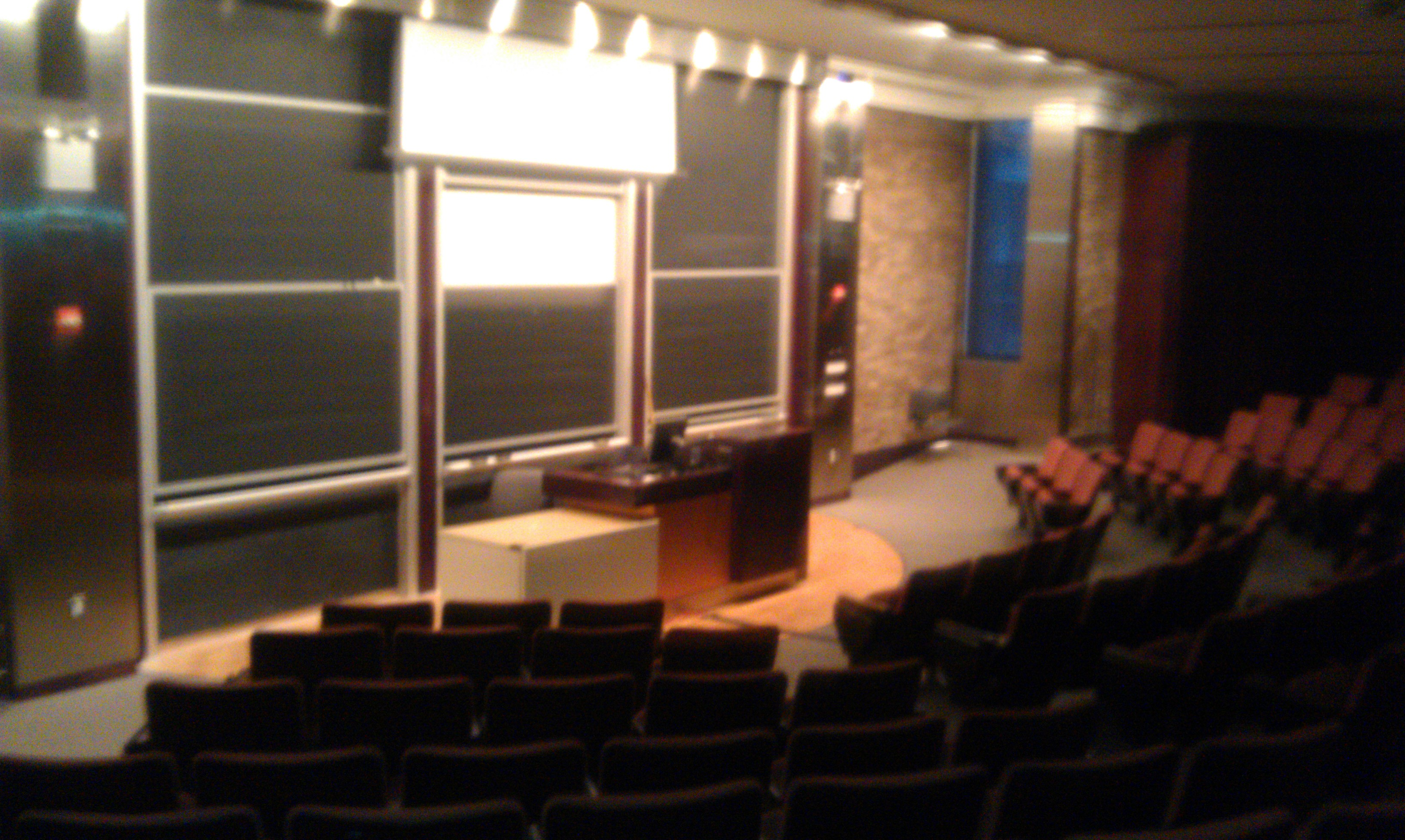
Lecture Hall at Warren Weaver Hall

The Graduate Department of Computer Science offers a PhD in computer science. In addition it offers Master of Science degrees in computer science, information systems (in conjunction with the Stern School of Business), and in scientific computing. For the PhD program, every PhD computer science student must receive a grade of A or A− on the final examination for algorithms, systems, applications, and a PhD-level course chosen by the student that does not satisfy the first three requirements, such as cryptography and numerical methods. Students may take the final exam for any these courses without being enrolled in the course.

The Computer Science Masters program offers instruction in the fundamental principles, design and applications of computer systems and computer technologies. Students who obtain an MS degree in computer science are qualified to do significant development work in the computer industry or important application areas. Those who receive a doctoral degree are in a position to hold faculty appointments and do research and development work at the forefront of this rapidly changing and expanding field. The emphasis for the MS in Information Systems program is on the use of computer systems in business. For the Master of Science in Scientific Computing, it is designed to provide broad training in areas related to scientific computing using modern computing technology and mathematical modeling arising in various applications. The core of the curriculum for all computer science graduate students consists of courses in algorithms, programming languages, compilers, artificial intelligence, database systems, and operating systems. Advanced courses are offered in many areas such as natural language processing, the theory of computation, computer vision, software engineering, compiler optimization techniques, computer graphics, distributed computing, multimedia, networks, cryptography and security, groupware and computational finance. Adjunct faculty, drawn from outside academia, teach special topics courses in their areas of expertise.

Unless outside fellowships or scholarships are available to the students, all admitted Courant PhD students are granted with the GSAS MacCracken award. The fellowship covers the tuition and provides 9 months of stipend along with other benefits such as health insurance and special housing opportunities. The MacCracken funding is renewable for a period of up to five years, assuming satisfactory progress toward the degree.

Doctoral students take advanced courses in their areas of specialization, followed by a period of research and the preparation and defense of the doctoral thesis. Courant Students in PhD programs may earn a master's degree while in progress toward the PhD program. Areas where there are special funding opportunities for graduate students include: Mathematics, Mechanics, and Material Sciences, Number Theory, Probability, and Scientific Computing. All PhD candidates are required to take a written comprehensive examination, oral preliminary examination, and create a dissertation defense. Each supported doctoral student has access to his or her own dedicated Unix workstation. Many other research machines provide for abundant access to a variety of computer architectures, including a distributed computing laboratory.

=== Undergraduate program ===
The Courant Institute houses New York University's undergraduate programs in computer science and mathematics. In addition, CIMS provides opportunities and facilities for undergraduate students to do and discuss mathematical research, including an undergraduate math lounge on the 11th floor and an undergraduate computer science lounge on the 3rd floor of Warren Weaver Hall.

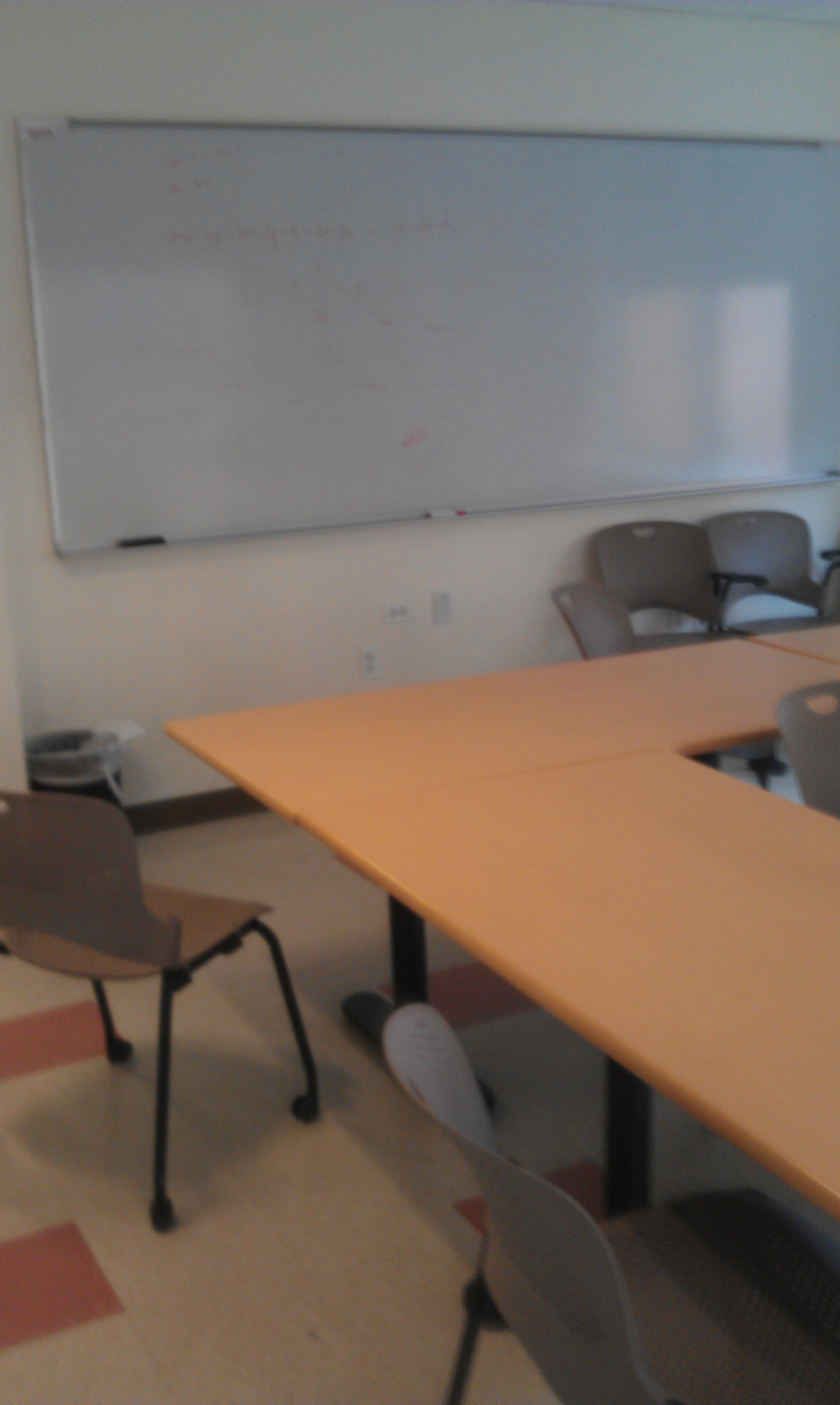
Classroom at Warren Weaver Hall

The mathematics and computer science undergraduate and graduate programs at the Courant Institute has a strong focus on building quantitative and problem-solving skills through teamwork. An undergraduate computer science course on Computer Vision, for example, requires students to be in small teams to use and apply recently developed algorithms by researchers around the world on their own. One example assignment requires a student to study a paper written by researchers from Microsoft Research Cambridge in order to do an assignment on Segmentation and Graph Cut. To encourage innovation, students in advanced coursework are allowed to use any means to complete their assignment, such as a programming language of their choice and hacking a Kinect through legal means.

The Courant Institute's undergraduate program also encourages students to engage in research with professors and graduate students. About 30% of undergraduate students participate in academic research through the competitive Research Experiences for Undergraduates program funded by the National Science Foundation or research funded primarily by the Dean's Undergraduate Research Fund. The Courant Institute has one of the highest percentage of undergraduate students doing research within New York University. With permission of their advisers or faculty, undergraduate students may take graduate-level courses. Courant undergraduate students through the years and alumni contribute greatly to the vitality of the Mathematics and Computer Science departments. Some accomplishments by current and former undergraduate Courant students include an Apple Worldwide Developers Conference Scholarship Winner, development of Object Category Recognition Techniques to sort garbage for recycling for the NYC's trash program, placement in 7th out of 42 in the ACM International Collegiate Programming Contest (ICPC), and inventors of the Diaspora (software) social network.

The undergraduate division of the Department of Mathematics offers Bachelor of Arts (BA) and Bachelor of Science (BS) degrees in Mathematics. It consists of a wide variety of courses in pure and applied mathematics taught by a distinguished faculty with a tradition of excellence in teaching and research. Students in advanced coursework often participate in formulating models outside the field of mathematics as well as in analyzing them. For example, an advanced mathematics course in Computers in Medicine and Biology requires a student to construct two computer models selected from the following list: circulation, gas exchange in the lung, control of cell volume, and the renal countercurrent mechanism. The student uses the models to conduct simulated physiological experiments.

The undergraduate division of the Department of Computer Science offers a Bachelor of Arts (BA) degree, and fours minors. These are the computer science minor, web programming and applications minor, joint minor in computer science/mathematics, and the computer science education minor available in collaboration with NYU Steinhardt. The BA degree can also be pursued with honors. Students may combine the degree with other majors within the College of Arts and Science to create a personalized joint major. Two specific combined degrees are the joint major in computer science/economics and the joint major in computer science/mathematics. The Department of Computer Science also offers a BS/BE Dual Degree in computer science and engineering and an accelerated master's program available to qualifying undergraduates in conjunction with the Tandon School of Engineering.

=== Academic research ===
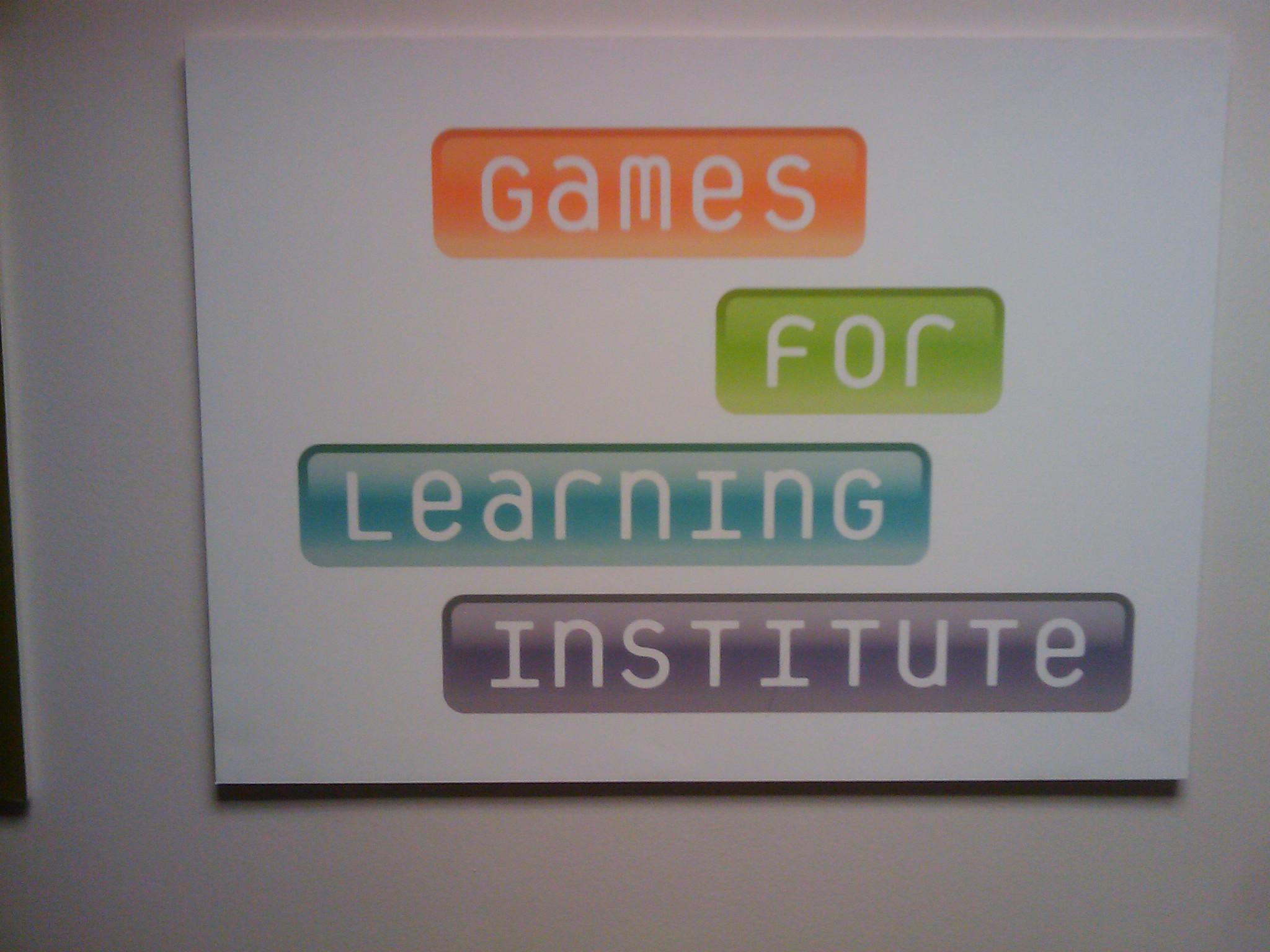
The Courant Institute along with Microsoft Research are the founders of the Games for Learning Institute

The Department of Mathematics at Courant is known as a leading position in analysis and applied mathematics, including partial differential equations, differential geometry, dynamical systems, probability and stochastic processes, scientific computation, mathematical finance, mathematical physics, and fluid dynamics. A special feature of the institute is its interdisciplinary character, with courses, seminars, and active research collaborations in areas such as financial mathematics, materials science, visual neural science, atmosphere/ocean science, cardiac fluid dynamics, plasma physics, and mathematical genomics. Another special feature is the central role of analysis, which provides a bridge between pure and applied mathematics. The Department of Computer Science has strengths in multimedia, programming languages and systems, distributed and parallel computing, and the analysis of algorithms.

Since 1948, Courant Institute has maintained its own research journal, Communications on Pure and Applied Mathematics. While the journal represents the full spectrum of the institute's mathematical research activity, most articles are in the fields of applied mathematics, mathematical analysis, or mathematical physics. Its contents over the years amount to a modern history of the theory of partial differential equations. Most articles originate within the institute or are specially invited. The institute also publishes its own series of lecture notes. They are based on the research interests of the faculty and visitors of the institute, originated in advanced graduate courses and mini-courses offered at the institute.

== Resources ==
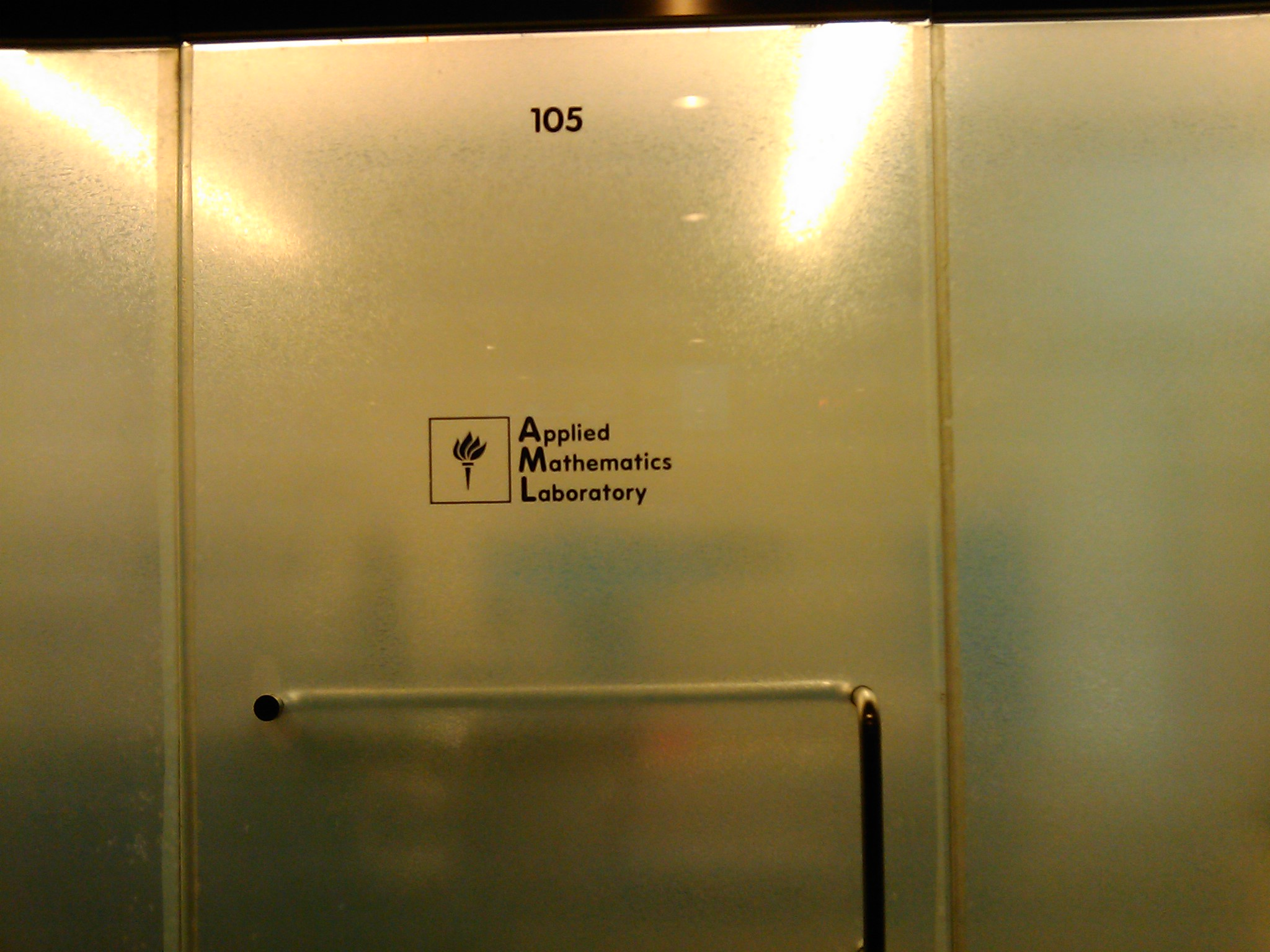
Applied Mathematics Laboratory

=== Warren Weaver Hall & 60 Fifth Avenue ===
The Department of Mathematics is housed in Warren Weaver Hall, named for the Rockefeller Foundation officer, on Mercer Street in NYU's Greenwich Village campus. The building contains lecture halls on the first and second floors, two meeting/seminar rooms on every floor from the 3rd floor to the 13th floor, and a large common lounge on the 13th floor used for studying and open discussions in topics of mathematics and computer science. It also houses a variety of well-equipped laboratories and offices for students and faculty to conduct research and discuss topics in mathematical sciences.

The Computer Science Department and Center for Data Science are located at 60 fifth Avenue.

=== Computing resources ===
The Courant Institute has an IBM eServer BladeCenter system capable of peak performance of 4.5 TFLOPS. The acquisition of this supercomputer was funded by IBM and federal funding and is used primarily for research by the faculty and graduate and undergraduate students of the institute. Computers at the institute run Windows, Solaris, Mac OS X, and Red Hat Enterprise Linux operating systems. There are also many other specialized Linux-based operating systems for research purposes. Every faculty and student office room is fully equipped with scientific software and computer stations. Wi-Fi and X terminals are available in public locations and every faculty and student office.

All graduate students are provided with an account to access computers and other resources within the institute's network. Undergraduate students are provided CIMS accounts with the approval of their advisor, sponsorship by a Courant professor, advanced coursework, or for research purposes. The institute's computing resources are not accessible to others without sponsorship by a CIMS professor or approval by either the Department of Mathematics or Department of Computer Science. Faculty, staff, and students with Courant account have access to free full-featured software provided by the MSDN Academic Alliance and specialized computing resources used primarily for research.

=== Major research resources ===
CIMS houses an advanced multimillion-dollar Courant Applied Mathematics Laboratory that opened in 1998, co-founded by Stephen Childress and Michael J. Shelley, and sponsored by US Department of Energy and the National Science Foundation. It comprises an experimental facility in fluid mechanics and other applied areas and a visualization and simulation facility. The Center for Atmosphere-Ocean Science is also housed at CIMS and is an interdisciplinary research and graduate program within the Courant Institute of Mathematical Sciences.

== cSplash and notable student activities ==
=== cSplash ===
Every year, CIMS offers cSplash or Courant Splash, a festival mathematics and computer science program for high school students. It is a one-day festival of classes in the mathematical and computer sciences, designed and taught by graduate and undergraduate students, faculty, and others associated with the Courant Institute of Mathematical Sciences.

=== Extracurricular activities ===
There are many clubs within the Courant Institute open to undergraduate and graduate students alike. These clubs include the Courant Student Organization, The ACM at NYU, Women-in-Computing (WinC), The Mathematics Society, Masters Association for Computer Science and many more. Additionally, CIMS sponsors and holds seminars and colloquiums almost daily on weekdays on topics of interest, in which some of whom may be held outside of Warren Weaver Hall. Many speakers of these seminars and colloquiums are experienced researchers from corporations from a variety of industries and researchers from private and government research laboratories, top universities, and NYU. Every academic year, CIMS holds award ceremonies, showcases, and parties to celebrate their faculty and undergraduate and graduate students and keep the academic atmosphere fun and enjoyable at CIMS. One such example is the NYU Computer Science Department Showcase held every semester to showcase projects that have been completed in various computer science graduate and undergraduate courses.

== Directors ==
Image	Name	Timespan
	Richard Courant	(1935–1958)
	James J. Stoker	(1958–1966)
	Kurt O. Friedrichs	(1966–1967)
	Jürgen Moser	(1967–1970)
	Louis Nirenberg	(1970–1972)
	Peter Lax	(1972–1980)
	S. R. Srinivasa Varadhan	(1980–1984)
	Cathleen Synge Morawetz	(1984–1988)
	Henry McKean	(1988–1994)
	David W. McLaughlin	(1994–2002)
	Charles M. Newman	(2002–2006)
	Leslie Greengard	(2006–2011)
	Gérard Ben Arous	(2011–2016)
	Richard J. Cole	(2016–2017)
	Russel E. Caflisch	(2017–2025)
	Gérard Ben Arous	(2025–2026)
	Denis Zorin	(2026–present)

== Notable Courant faculty ==
This is a small selection of Courant's famous faculty over the years and a few of their distinctions:

- Gérard Ben Arous, Davidson Prize
- Marsha Berger, NASA Software of the Year, National Academy of Engineering, National Academy of Sciences
- Richard Bonneau
- Fedor Bogomolov
- Luis Caffarelli, 2012 Wolf Prize, 2018 Shaw Prize, 2023 Abel Prize
- Sylvain Cappell, Guggenheim Fellowship
- Sourav Chatterjee, Davidson Prize
- Jeff Cheeger, Veblen Prize, National Academy of Sciences, American Academy of Arts and Sciences, Guggenheim Fellowship, Max Planck Research Prize
- Stephen Childress, Guggenheim Fellowship, American Physical Society Fellow
- Demetrios Christodoulou, 1993 MacArthur Fellow, National Academy of Sciences, American Academy of Arts and Sciences, Shaw Prize, Bôcher Memorial Prize
- Richard J. Cole, Guggenheim Fellowship
- Martin Davis, Steele Prize
- Percy Deift, George Pólya Prize, Guggenheim Fellowship, National Academy of Sciences, American Academy of Arts and Science
- Aleksandar Donev, Simons Foundation Fellow in Mathematics
- Rob Fergus, NSF Faculty Early Career Development Program (CAREER),NSF Presidential Young Investigator, Presidential Faculty Fellows (PFF), Presidential Early Career Award for Scientists and Engineers (PECASE), Sloan Research Fellowship
- Kit Fine
- Kurt O. Friedrichs, 1976 National Medal of Science
- Paul Garabedian, NAS Prize in Applied Mathematics, National Academy of Sciences, American Academy of Arts and Science
- James Glimm, Steele Prize, 2002 National Medal of Science
- Leslie Greengard, Steele Prize, Packard Foundation Fellowship, NSF Presidential Young Investigator, National Academy of Engineering, National Academy of Sciences, American Academy of Arts and Science
- Mikhail Gromov, 2009 Abel Prize, Wolf Prize, Steele Prize, Kyoto Prize, Balzan Prize, National Academy of Sciences, American Academy of Arts and Science
- Larry Guth
- Martin Hairer, 2014 Fields Medal
- Helmut Hofer, Ostrowski Prize, National Academy of Sciences
- Fritz John, 1984 MacArthur Fellow
- Joseph B. Keller, 1988 National Medal of Science, Wolf Prize
- Michel Kervaire
- Subhash Khot, 2010 Alan T. Waterman Award, 2014 Nevanlinna Prize
- Bruce Kleiner
- Morris Kline, National Academy of Sciences, prolific author and popularizer of mathematics, prominent critic of math education
- Peter Lax, Abel Prize winner, 1986 National Medal of Science, Steele Prize, Wolf Prize, Norbert Wiener Prize
- Yann LeCun, Turing Award , National Academy of Sciences, American Academy of Arts and Science, French Academy of Science
- Lin Fanghua, Bôcher Memorial Prize, American Academy of Arts and Science
- Wilhelm Magnus
- Andrew Majda, NAS Prize in Applied Mathematics, John von Neumann Prize (SIAM)
- Henry McKean, National Academy of Science, American Academy of Arts and Science
- Bud Mishra, Association for Computing Machinery Fellow
- Cathleen Synge Morawetz, 1998 National Medal of Science, Steele Prize, Birkhoff Prize, Noether Lecturer, National Academy of Sciences, American Academy of Arts and Science
- Jürgen Moser, Wolf Prize, James Craig Watson Medal
- Assaf Naor, European Mathematical Society Prize, Packard Fellowship, Salem Prize, Bôcher Memorial Prize, Blavatnik Award
- Charles Newman, National Academy of Science, American Academy of Arts and Science
- Louis Nirenberg, Crafoord Prize, National Medal of Science, Steele Prize, Bôcher Memorial Prize, Chern Medal, Abel Prize, National Academy of Sciences, American Academy of Arts and Science
- Michael Overton
- Laxmi Parida, IBM Master Inventor
- Charles S. Peskin, 1983 MacArthur Fellow, Birkhoff Prize, National Medal of Science
- Amir Pnueli, National Academy of Engineering, Israel Prize, Turing Award, Association for Computing Machinery Fellow
- Peter Sarnak, Wolf Prize
- Jack Schwartz, who developed the programming language SETL at NYU and was in charge of the Robotics group.
- Michael J. Shelley, American Physical Society Fellow, François Naftali Frenkiel Award (APS)
- Victor Shoup, who with Ronald Cramer developed the Cramer–Shoup cryptosystem
- Joel Spencer
- K. R. Sreenivasan
- Daniel L. Stein, Fellow of American Physical Society, Fellow of American Association for the Advancement of Science
- S. R. Srinivasa Varadhan, Abel Prize winner, Steele Prize, National Academy of Sciences, American Academy of Arts and Science, Fellow of the Royal Society, National Medal of Science
- Akshay Venkatesh, Salem Prize, Packard Fellowship, 2018 Fields Medal
- Hong Wang, Maryam Mirzakhani New Frontiers Prize, Salem Prize, Ostrowski Prize, Sadosky Prize, Clay Research Award, New Horizons in Mathematics Prize, 2026 Fields Medal
- Olof B. Widlund
- Margaret H. Wright, National Academy of Science, National Academy of Engineering
- Lai-Sang Young, Satter Prize, Guggenheim Fellowship, American Academy of Arts and Science
- Jun Zhang, American Physical Society Fellow

== Notable Courant alumni ==
This is a small selection of Courant's alumni:

- Anjelina Belakovskaia (Masters in Finance 2001), U.S. Women's Chess Champion.
- Anita Borg (PhD 1981), founding director of the Institute for Women and Technology (IWT)
- Alexandre Chorin, (PhD 1966) National Medal of Science
- Ivan Corwin (PhD 2011), professor at Columbia University
- Charles Epstein (PhD 1983), hyperbolic geometry
- Jeffrey Epstein (1971-1974, did not graduate)
- Kenneth M. Golden (PhD 1984), applied mathematics of sea ice, Fellow of the Explorers Club
- Corwin Hansch (PhD 1944), statistics
- Joseph B. Keller, 1988 National Medal of Science, Wolf Prize
- Barbara Keyfitz (PhD 1970), Director of the Fields Institute
- David Korn (PhD 1969), creator of the KornShell,
- Sergiu Klainerman (PhD 1978), Professor at Princeton
- Morris Kline (PhD 1936), NYU Professor (1938–1975)
- Martin Kruskal, (PhD 1952) National Medal of Science, co-discoverer of solitons and the inverse scattering method for solving KdV
- Peter Lax (PhD 1949), recipient of the Abel Prize, National Medal of Science, Steele Prize, Wolf Prize, Norbert Wiener Prize
- Chen Li-an, (PhD 1968) Taiwanese Minister of Defence
- Cathleen Morawetz (PhD 1950), National Medal of Science, Birkhoff Prize, Lifetime Achievement Award from the AMS, professor emeritus at Courant Institute
- Louis Nirenberg (PhD 1949), Crafoord Prize, Bôcher Memorial Prize, National Medal of Science, Chern Medal, Abel Prize
- Stanley Osher (PhD 1966), Level Set method, professor at University of California, Los Angeles, Gauss Prize
- George C. Papanicolaou (PhD 1969), professor at Stanford University, National Academy of Sciences, American Academy of Arts and Science
- Sashi Reddi (serial entrepreneur, venture capitalist, angel investor, a technologist and a philanthropist)
- Gary Robinson, software engineer noted for anti-spam algorithms
- Christina Sormani (PhD 1996), professor at the City University of New York
- Shmuel Weinberger (PhD 1982), topology and geometry, Professor at University of Chicago
- Jacob Wolfowitz (PhD 1942), statistics and information theory

== See also ==
- Mikhail Gromov
- Peter Lax
- Yann LeCun
- Louis Nirenberg
- Amir Pnueli
- S. R. S. Varadhan
- List of New York University people
