= Flora Lewis =

American journalist (1922-2002)

- Flora Lewis ca. 1941
- Born: July 25, 1922; Los Angeles, California, US
- Died: May 26, 2002 (aged 79); Paris, France
- Education: Columbia University(M.A.); UCLA(B.A.)
- Occupation: journalist
- Years active: 1942–2002
- Employer: The New York Times
- Known for: reportage
- Spouse: Sydney Gruson
- Children: 3
- Awards: Overseas Press Club awards, Edward Weintal Award, Cross of the Chevalier of the Legion of Honor, NYWC's Matrix Award for Newspapers, NYU's Elmer Holmes Bobst Award in Arts and Letters

Flora Lewis (July 25, 1922 – May 26, 2002) was an American journalist.

== Background ==
Lewis was born into a Jewish family in Los Angeles. Her father Benjamin Lewis was a lawyer and mother Pauline Kallin a pianist. She graduated high school at the age of 15 and earned a BA from the University of California at Los Angeles graduating summa cum laude three years later. She was also elected to Phi Beta Kappa and received her master's degree from Columbia University's School of Journalism in 1942 just before turning 20.

== Career ==
In 1942, Lewis joined The Associated Press (AP) in New York and Washington. In 1945, the AP sent her to London, where she married Sydney Gruson, a New York Times correspondent. For the next 20 years, she was based in London, Jerusalem, Prague, Warsaw, Geneva, Bonn, Paris and Mexico City. European publishers included The Observer, The Economist, the International Herald Tribune in Paris, The Financial Times in London and France-Soir in Paris.

From 1956 to 1966, Lewis was a reporter for The Washington Post, where her work landed her on the master list of Nixon political opponents.

In 1966, Newsday published and syndicated her first column.

In 1972, The New York Times appointed her foreign and diplomatic correspondent. The Times then had a rule against hiring wives of its correspondents, Lewis, however, contributed frequently to The New York Times Magazine and wrote for other publications. She has the distinction of being the first woman to be given her own column on the New York Times op-ed page.

== Personal and death ==
From 1945 to 1972, Lewis was married to New York Times correspondent, editor, and publishing executive Sydney Gruson. She and Gruson had three children: Kerry (born in Ireland), Sheila (born in Israel), and Lindsey (born in Mexico).

Writing for the Jewish Women's Archive, Ari Goldman described her thus:

It was a kosher home where Jewish holidays were observed, one family member recalled, but Lewis retained little attachment to traditional Jewish life in her adulthood. In her dispatches she often showed sympathy for Israel, but also felt free to criticize the Jewish state when she thought its policies were wrongheaded. She titled a 1990 column on Israel "Lament for Jerusalem." It expressed a sense of disappointment but also of love, especially for the city’s longtime mayor, Teddy Kollek (b. 1911). She wrote: "If there’s a living soul who embodies the city of Jerusalem, it’s Teddy Kollek. This is a lament for the city, and for him, because he has made his life's work trying to revive it, beautify it and bring it harmony."

She died of cancer in Paris in 2002.

== Recognition and awards ==
Lewis received many awards for her journalism including for distinguished diplomatic reporting from Georgetown University's School of Foreign Service. She received honorary doctorates from the University of California at Los Angeles, Columbia, Princeton, Mount Holyoke, Bucknell, Muhlenberg College, and Manhattan Marymount. She received four awards from the Overseas Press Club: for foreign-affairs reporting (1957), daily newspaper or wire interpretation of foreign affairs (1963, 1977), and analysis of foreign affairs in Western Europe (1979). She also received the Edward Weintal Award (1978); the Cross of the Chevalier of the Legion of Honor, France's highest peacetime award (1981); the Matrix Award for Newspapers from New York Women in Communication (1985), and the Elmer Holmes Bobst Award in Arts and Letters from New York University (1987).

== Impact ==
For her obituary, the New York Times wrote:

Heads of government and ordinary readers in the United States and Europe, where she lived for much of her career, looked to Flora Lewis's columns not only for her access to people in high places, but also for the dogged reporting and the sophisticated analysis that resulted.

Seymour Brody likens Lewis's life to "that of a juggler in trying to balance her role as a journalist, wife, and mother," concluding that her achievements in the male-dominated profession "opened the way for other women to enter and to succeed in the newspaper industry." Rupert Cornwell stated that "Lewis had formidable assets, starting with an access to those in power that often made her colleagues green with envy. More important, she possessed a mind that could cut to the essential of an issue with astonishing speed. To her writing she brought a clarity and analytical power that enabled her to explain complicated issues without ignoring all-important nuances."

By contrast, columnist Eric Alterman wrote that at the Times, Lewis "filed from Paris what was quite possibly the most boring regular column in the history of journalism," which "certainly contained no hint that the writer was a woman." The New Republic′s "World's Most Boring" headline competition was inspired by a Lewis column titled "Worthwhile Canadian Initiative."

== Writings ==
Flora Lewis wrote four books and contributed to a fifth, according to the Library of Congress catalog.

- A Case History of Hope: The Story of Poland's Peaceful Revolutions (1958)
  - Polish Volcano: A Case History of Hope (1959)
- Red Pawn: The Story of Noel Field (1965)
  - The Man Who Disappeared: The Strange History of Noel Field (1966)
  - Pion rouge: l'histoire de Noël Field (1967)
- One of Our H-Bombs is Missing (1967)
- Europe: A Tapestry of Nations (1987)
  - Europe: Road to Unity (1992)
- Avenir de la démocratie: un défi pour la société et l'Eglise (2000)

== Photos ==
- Jewish Women's Archive Flora Lewis (by Bradford Bachrach)

== External resources ==
- Pearson, Richard (3 June 2002). "Journalist, Author Flora Lewis Dies". The Washington Post.
- Cornwall, Rupert (28 June 2002). "Flora Lewis Trailblazing US foreign correspondent". The Independent.
- "Flora Lewis, 79; Foreign Correspondent, Expert on Europe". Los Angeles Times. 3 June 2002.
