= Julia Kempe =

French, German, and Israeli researcher in quantum computing

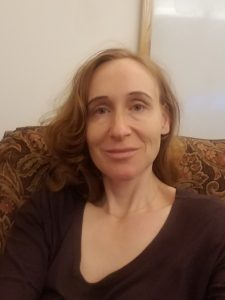
Julia Kempe

Julia Kempe is a French, German, and Israeli researcher in quantum computing. She is currently the Director of the New York University Center for Data Science and Professor at the Courant Institute.

== Education and career ==
Kempe was born in East Berlin, to a family of Russian descent. She moved to Austria in 1990, and did her undergraduate studies in mathematics and physics at the University of Vienna from 1992 to 1995, with a year as an exchange student in physics at the University of Technology Sydney. She then earned two Master of Advanced Studies (DEA) degrees in France: one in mathematics in 1996 from Pierre and Marie Curie University and another in 1997 in physics from the École normale supérieure. She completed two doctorates in 2001. The dissertation for her Ph.D. in computer science from the École nationale supérieure des télécommunications was entitled Quantum Computing: Random Walks and Entanglement, and was supervised by Gérard Cohen. Her second Ph.D., in mathematics, was from the University of California, Berkeley, with a dissertation entitled Universal Noiseless Quantum Computation: Theory and Applications and was jointly supervised by Elwyn Berlekamp and chemist K. Birgitta Whaley.

She joined CNRS at the University of Paris-Sud in 2001 (overlapping with postdoctoral studies at Berkeley and the Berkeley Mathematical Sciences Research Institute), joined the Tel Aviv University faculty in 2007, and moved her CNRS position from Paris-Sud to Paris Diderot in 2010.. Between 2011 and 2018 she was a researcher in finance. She became director of the Center of Data Science at NYU and a professor at the Courant Institute in September 2018.

== Awards and honors ==
In 2006, Kempe won the bronze medal of CNRS and the Irène Joliot-Curie Prize of the French government. In 2009 she won the Krill Prize of the Wolf Foundation, and in 2010 she won the Trophée des femmes en or (English: "Women in Gold" trophy ) for her research. In 1998 she received a reward from Studienstiftung des Deutschen Volkes (English: "German Academic Scholarship Foundation") which was awarded to only 0.25% of students at the time.^{[10]} She became a knight in the National Order of Merit in 2010. In 2018, she was elected to the Academia Europaea.

== Selected publications ==
- DiVincenzo, D. P.; Bacon, D.; Kempe, J.; Burkard, G.; Whaley, K. B. (2000), "Universal quantum computation with the exchange interaction", Nature, 408 (6810): 339–342, arXiv:quant-ph/0005116, Bibcode:2000Natur.408..339D, doi:10.1038/35042541, PMID 11099036, S2CID 4326729.
- Kempe, J.; Bacon, D.; Lidar, D. A.; Whaley, K. B. (2001), "Theory of decoherence-free fault-tolerant universal quantum computation", Physical Review A, 63 (4) 042307, arXiv:quant-ph/0004064, Bibcode:2001PhRvA..63d2307K, doi:10.1103/physreva.63.042307, S2CID 44200695.
- Kempe, J. (2003), "Quantum random walks: An introductory overview", Contemporary Physics, 44 (4): 307–327, arXiv:quant-ph/0303081, Bibcode:2003ConPh..44..307K, doi:10.1080/00107151031000110776, S2CID 17300331.
- Shenvi, Neil; Kempe, Julia; Whaley, K. Birgitta (2003), "Quantum random-walk search algorithm", Physical Review A, 67 (5) 052307, arXiv:quant-ph/0210064, Bibcode:2003PhRvA..67e2307S, doi:10.1103/physreva.67.052307, S2CID 8688989.
- Aharonov, Dorit; van Dam, Wim; Kempe, Julia; Landau, Zeph; Lloyd, Seth; Regev, Oded (2007), "Adiabatic quantum computation is equivalent to standard quantum computation", SIAM Journal on Computing, 37 (1): 166–194, arXiv:quant-ph/0405098, doi:10.1137/S0097539705447323, MR 2306288. Revised, SIAM Review 50 (4): 755–787, 2008, MR 2460803
