= Russel E. Caflisch =

American mathematician (born 1954)

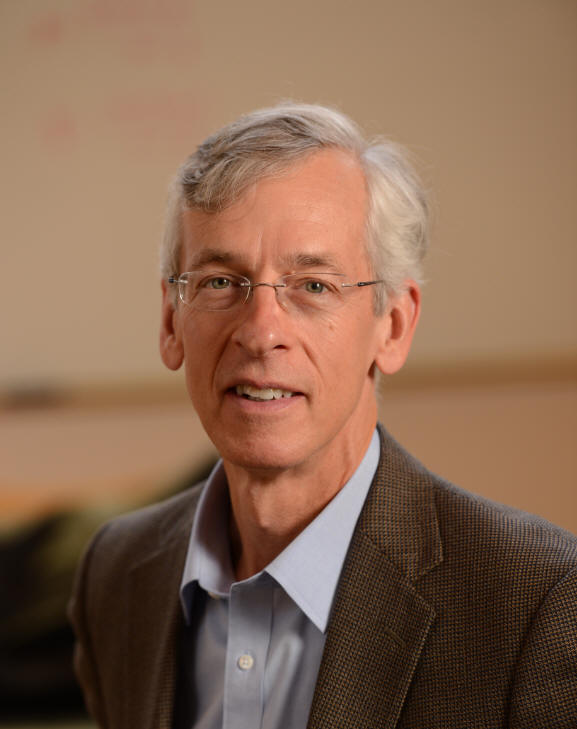
- Caflisch in 2012
- Born: April 29, 1954 (age 72)
- Education: Michigan State University (BS); New York University (MS, PhD)
- Spouse: Carol Lynn Meylan.
- Parent(s): Edward G. Caflisch; Dorothy G. Caflisch
- Scientific career
- Fields: Applied mathematics
- Workplaces: New York University; University of California, Los Angeles; Institute for Pure and Applied Mathematics
- Doctoral advisor: George Papanicolaou

Russel E. Caflisch (born 29 April 1954) is an American mathematician.

== Biography ==
Caflisch is a former Director of the Courant Institute of Mathematical Sciences at New York University (NYU), and a Professor in the Mathematics Department. Russel Edward Caflisch was born in Charleston, West Virginia. He received his bachelor's degree from Michigan State University in 1975. He earned a master's degree and Ph.D. in Mathematics from the Courant Institute of Mathematical Sciences at New York University. His dissertation was titled "The Fluid Dynamic Limit and Shocks for a Model Boltzmann Equation." (1978) He has also held faculty positions at Stanford and NYU. He has served as PhD advisor for 22 students, with 55 descendants. Until August 2017, Caflisch was the director of the Institute for Pure & Applied Mathematics (IPAM) and a professor in the Mathematics department, where he also held a joint appointment in the department of Materials Science and Engineering.

Caflisch was a founding member of California NanoSystems Institute (CNSI). Caflisch's expertise includes topics in the field of applied mathematics, including partial differential equations, fluid dynamics, plasma physics, materials science, Monte Carlo methods, and computational finance.

Caflisch served as Director of the Courant Institute until the end of his second term in May 2025. As of 2026, he serves as a Professor of Mathematics in the Courant Institute School of Mathematics, Computing, and Data Science.

== Recognition ==
Caflisch was awarded the Hertz Foundation Graduate Fellowship in 1975 and a Sloan Foundation Research Fellowship in 1984. He was named a fellow of the Society for Industrial and Applied Mathematics in 2009, the American Mathematical Society in 2012, and the American Academy of Arts and Sciences in 2013. He was elected a member of the National Academy of Sciences in April 2019.

Caflisch was an invited speaker at International Congress of Mathematicians in Madrid in 2006, and at the conference Dynamics, Equations and Applications in Kraków in 2019.

== Personal life ==
His parents are Edward G. Caflisch and Dorothy G. Caflisch.

Russel Caflisch is married to Carol Lynn Meylan.

== Books ==
- Mathematical Aspects of Vortex Dynamics (Society for Industrial and Applied Mathematics, 1989) ISBN 0898712351
