= Alice Anderson (writer) =

American poet

- Born: 1966 (age 59–60); Tulsa, Oklahoma, U.S.
- Education: California State University, Sacramento (BA); Sarah Lawrence College (MFA)
- Occupation: Poet
- Writing career
- Language: English
- Genre: Poetry
- Notable awards: Elmer Holmes Bobst Award

Alice Anderson (born 1966) is an American poet. She is particularly known for her collection, Human Nature.

== Biography ==
Alice Anderson was born May 20, 1966, in Tulsa, Oklahoma. She spent her childhood in California and Mississippi.

Anderson took a classes at California State University, Sacramento, receiving a BA in English. As an undergrad Anderson worked with the poet Dennis Schmitz who encouraged her to go to graduate school. She received an MFA in Poetry from Sarah Lawrence College.

Anderson was living in Ocean Springs, Mississippi when Hurricane Katrina hit. Her work deals with issues that have impacted her life: family violence, intimate partner violence, and traumatic brain injury.

== Awards ==
- 1994 Elmer Holmes Bobst Award for Emerging Writers
- 1994 Sarah Lawrence Poetry Prize

== Works ==
- Some Bright Morning, I'll Fly Away: A Memoir (St. Martin's Press, 2017)
- The Watermark (Eyewear Publishing, 2016)
- Human Nature (NYU Press, 1994)
