= Gould Plaza =

Plaza in Manhattan, New York

Coordinates: 40.72902°N 73.99591°W

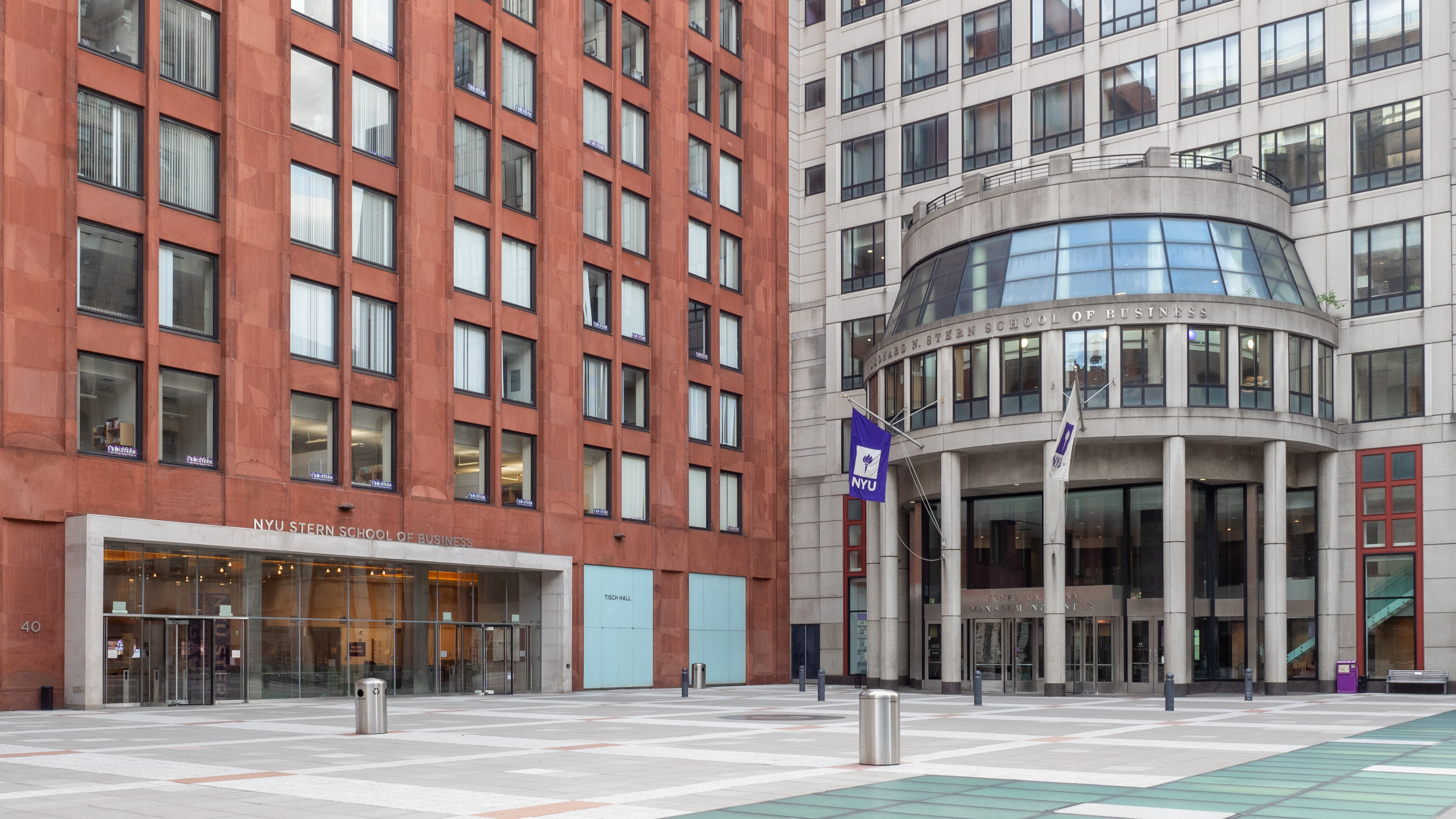
Gould Plaza, with the buildings of the Stern School of Business behind it

Jeffrey S. Gould Plaza (commonly referred to as Gould Plaza) is an outdoor campus plaza located on West 4th Street in Greenwich Village, Manhattan, New York City. It is the home of several New York University (NYU) schools. It was named after NYU trustee Jeffrey S. Gould, and is also the namesake for the NYU welcome center of the same name. Surrounding the Plaza are the buildings of the Stern School of Business, Courant Institute of Mathematics, NYU's admissions center, Warren Weaver Hall, NYU's External Affairs building, and the Frederick Loewe Theatre.

The plaza is known as a social meeting place where NYU students congregate after classes.

== Location ==
Gould Plaza is located on West 4th Street at Greenwich Village between Mercer Street and Washington Square East. It is characterized by large, red plaster and grey brick buildings surrounding it on three of the four sides, with the remaining side facing West 4th Street. The buildings on the campus side of the plaza have large glass panes dominating their fronts, with prominent purple flags with NYU logos adorning the university's buildings. The floor of the plaza is made of mostly stone slabs with horizontal glass panes forming a walkway across the plaza. The left side of the plaza is dominated by public benches, which NYU alumni can name.

=== NYU buildings ===
The plaza was formed after the Stern School of Business was constructed in 1900. The Courant Institute of Mathematics was built in 1932 in the Warren Weaver Hall, under which a natural gas co-generation power production plant was built, designed to reduce the carbon footprint of the university, was built in 2011. Goddard Hall also is on the periphery of the Plaza, and is an undergraduate freshman hall commonly shown during NYU campus tours. Frederick Loewe Theatre, a classic proscenium-style theater at NYU, stands next to Goddard Hall and is a performance hall for Tisch School of Arts and Steinhardt School of Culture, Education, and Human Development students.

=== Nearby buildings ===
Other buildings nearby the plaza include NYU's Elmer Holmes Bobst Library, which was opened on September 12, 1973, Kimmel Center for University Life, and NYU Steinhart's main building. The plaza is also close to several religious institutions, including Judson Memorial Church, the Islamic Center at NYU, and the Hebrew Union College - Jewish Institute of Religion, through the Plaza is not connected to Hebrew Union. The high student traffic in the area as the point where four NYU school students often meet makes Gould Plaza a social meeting place for multiple NYU student clubs, which also makes it appealing to street musicians and buskers who often perform on or near the Plaza. New York City food trucks are also known to frequent the location.

Over the years, Gould Plaza has been a place for international festivals to meet, including the World Science Festival, which uses the Plaza and its surrounding buildings as a festival destination.
