= Aleksandar Donev =

American mathematician (1979–2023)

- Born: Veles, Socialist Federal Republic of Yugoslavia
- Education: Princeton University; Michigan State University
- Known for: Computational Mathematics
- Awards: Simons Foundation Fellow in Mathematics (2017)
- Scientific career
- Fields: Applied mathematics, scientific computing, computational physics, materials science, computational biology
- Workplaces: Courant Institute of Mathematical Sciences; New York University; Lawrence Berkeley Laboratory
- Doctoral advisor: Salvatore Torquato
- Website: math.nyu.edu/faculty/donev/

Aleksandar Nikola Donev (November 1979 – November 2023) was an American and Macedonian applied mathematician who worked on scientific computing, fluid dynamics, mathematical materials science and computational biology. He was a professor at the Courant Institute of Mathematical Sciences, New York University.

== Background ==
Donev grew up in Veles, Socialist Republic of Macedonia. At age 17 he began studies at the State University of New York at Plattsburgh, a small town in northern New York State. He soon transferred to Michigan State University in East Lansing from where he graduated at the top of his class in Physics. He earned a Ph.D. degree in Applied and Computational Mathematics from Princeton University in 2006 under the guidance of Salvatore Torquato. His thesis work concerned packing of hard elliptical particles.

He was a postdoctoral fellow at the Lawrence Livermore Laboratory and later won the Luis W. Alvarez Postdoctoral Fellowship to work at the Lawrence Berkeley Laboratory. In 2010 Donev joined the Courant Institute of Mathematical Sciences, New York University as faculty.

Donev died on November 2023 before the age of 45. He is mourned by family, friends, students, colleagues and collaborators.

== Research ==
Donev worked on Scientific Computing, Computational Mathematics and particularly for his work on Fluctuating Hydrodynamics, and numerical methods for suspensions in Stokes flow and complex fluids. He worked on modeling the effect of thermal noise in physical systems, particularly gasses, liquids, colloids and cross linked networks of actin filaments and related applications.

== Honors ==
- Early Career Research Award from the Department of Energy in 2012.
- Young Investigator Award from the Air Force Office of Scientific Research in 2012.
- Simons Fellow in Mathematics Award from the Simons Foundation in 2017.
