= Josselin Garnier =

French mathematician (born 1971)

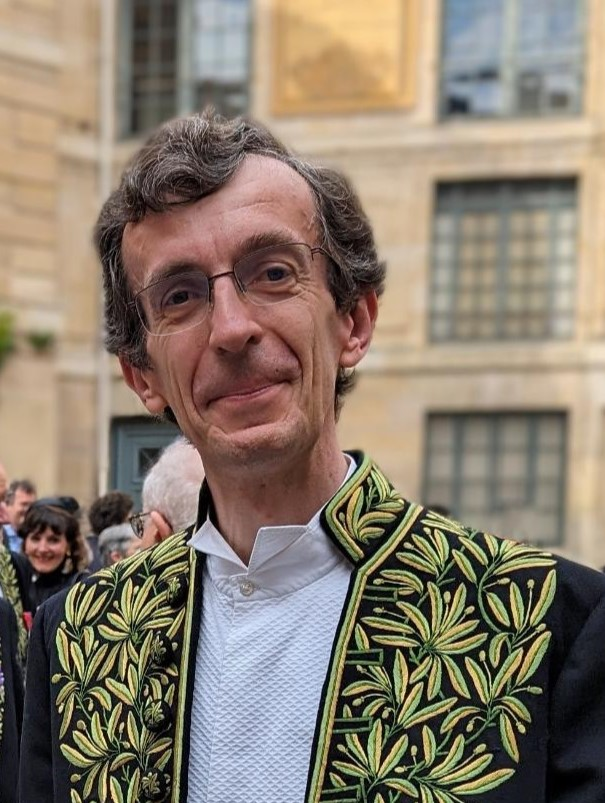
- June 2024
- Born: 18 Juin 1971; Orléans, France
- Awards: Felix Klein Prize; Blaise Pascal Prize; Member of the Institut Universitaire de France; Member of the French Academy of Sciences

Academic background
- Education: École normale supérieure, École polytechnique
- Doctoral advisor: Jean-Pierre Fouque

Academic work
- Discipline: Mathematics
- Institutions: École polytechnique

Josselin Garnier (born 18 June 1971) is a French mathematician.

Garnier studied from 1991 to 1994 at the École normale supérieure (master's degree) and received in 1996 his doctorate from the École polytechnique with thesis Ondes en milieux aleatoires (Waves in random media) under the supervision of Jean-Pierre Fouque. In 2000 Garnier habilitated at Pierre and Marie Curie University (Paris VI). In 2001 he became an assistant professor at the University of Toulouse. He became in 2005 an assistant professor and 2007 a full professor at Paris Diderot University (Paris VII). He works there at the Laboratoire de Probabilités et Modèles Aléatoires and the laboratory Jacques-Louis Lions.

Garnier deals with stochastic analysis of partial differential equations with applications in a variety of fields such as optics, plasma physics, Bose-Einstein condensates, telecommunications, antenna design, and image data analysis in disordered media, for example, in the seismological mapping of the subsurface in California. Among other things, he worked on target design in the Laser Mégajoule experiment on inertial confinement fusion involving lasers. He proved the existence of solitons in disordered media and studied the time-reversal invariance of the propagation of waves in disordered media. He deals with the statistical approach to hydrodynamic instabilities and general hydrodynamic numerical modeling in complex environments.

He has research contracts for the Commissariat à l'énergie atomique (CEA) (of which he is a scientific member), the Électricité de France (EDF), and the European Aeronautic Defence and Space Company (EADS).

In 2008 he received the Felix Klein Prize from the European Mathematical Society. In 2007 he received the Blaise Pascal Prize from the French Academy of Sciences. In 2008 he was elected a member of the Institut Universitaire de France. In 2018 he was an invited speaker at the International Congress of Mathematicians in Rio de Janeiro.

== Selected publications ==
- with J.-P. Fouque and George C. Papanicolaou: Wave propagation and time reversal in random layered media. Springer, New York 2007, ISBN 0387308903.
