= Liliana Borcea =

Romanian-born American mathematician

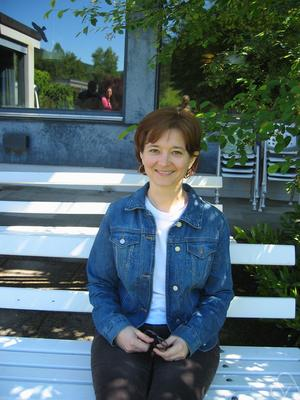
- Borcea at Oberwolfach in 2006
- Education: Stanford University (Ph.D., M.S.); University of Bucharest
- Scientific career
- Workplaces: Columbia University (2024–); University of Michigan (2013–2024); Rice University (1996–2013)
- Doctoral advisor: George C. Papanicolaou

Liliana Borcea is the George P. Livanos Professor of Applied Physics and Applied Mathematics in the Department of Applied Physics and Applied Mathematics at Columbia University. She was previously the Peter Field Collegiate Professor of Mathematics at the University of Michigan. Her research interests are in scientific computing and applied mathematics, including the scattering and transport of electromagnetic waves.

== Education and career ==
Borcea is originally from Romania, and earned a diploma in applied physics in 1987 from the University of Bucharest. She came to Stanford University for her graduate studies in Scientific Computing and Computational Mathematics, earning a master's degree in 1992 and completing her doctorate in 1996, under the supervision of George C. Papanicolaou.

After postdoctoral research at the California Institute of Technology, she joined the Rice University department of Computational and Applied Mathematics in 1996, and became the Noah Harding Professor at Rice in 2007. In 2013 she moved to Michigan as Peter Field Collegiate Professor. She served on the Scientific Advisory Board for the Institute for Computational and Experimental Research in Mathematics (ICERM).

== Recognition ==
She was recognized as the AWM-SIAM Sonia Kovalevsky Lecturer for 2017, selected "for her distinguished scientific contributions to the mathematical and numerical analysis of wave propagation in random media, array imaging in complex environments, and inverse problems in high-contrast electrical impedance tomography, as well as model reduction techniques for parabolic and hyperbolic partial differential equations." She is a member of the 2018 class of SIAM Fellows. She was elected to the American Academy of Arts and Sciences in 2023.
