= New York University Center for Data Science =

Secondary education program and research center

- Established: 2013
- Parent institution: Courant Institute School of Mathematics, Computing, and Data Science
- Director: Julia Kempe
- Location: New York City
- Website: cds.nyu.edu

The New York University Center for Data Science (CDS) is a unit within the Courant Institute School of Mathematics, Computing, and Data Science at New York University. It was established in 2013, with Yann LeCun serving as the founding director.

== History ==
In 2011, New York University launched a university-wide initiative in Data Science and Statistics under the leadership of Gerard Ben Arous, who was the director of the Courant Institute of Mathematical Sciences and NYU's Vice Provost for Science and Engineering at the time. Yann LeCun was invited to chair the working group, and they eventually recommended the creation of a multidisciplinary data science center in response to the growing demand for data scientists in academia, industry, and government. CDS was publicly announced in 2013, with Yann LeCun as its founding director. CDS offers degrees in data science at the undergraduate, masters and doctoral levels.

It is part of the Moore-Sloan Data Science Environment, a five-year $37.8 million cross-institutional partnership with Berkeley Institute for Data Science and the University of Washington that aims to advance data-intensive scientific discovery. The center holds multiple speaker series throughout the year, like the Text-as-Data & NLP seminars and Math and Data seminars.

In November 2025, the CDS was merged with the Courant Institute of Mathematical Sciences and the Department of Computer Science and Engineering at the Tandon School of Engineering to form the Courant Institute School of Mathematics, Computing, and Data Science.
