= Elmer Holmes Bobst Library =

Library at New York University

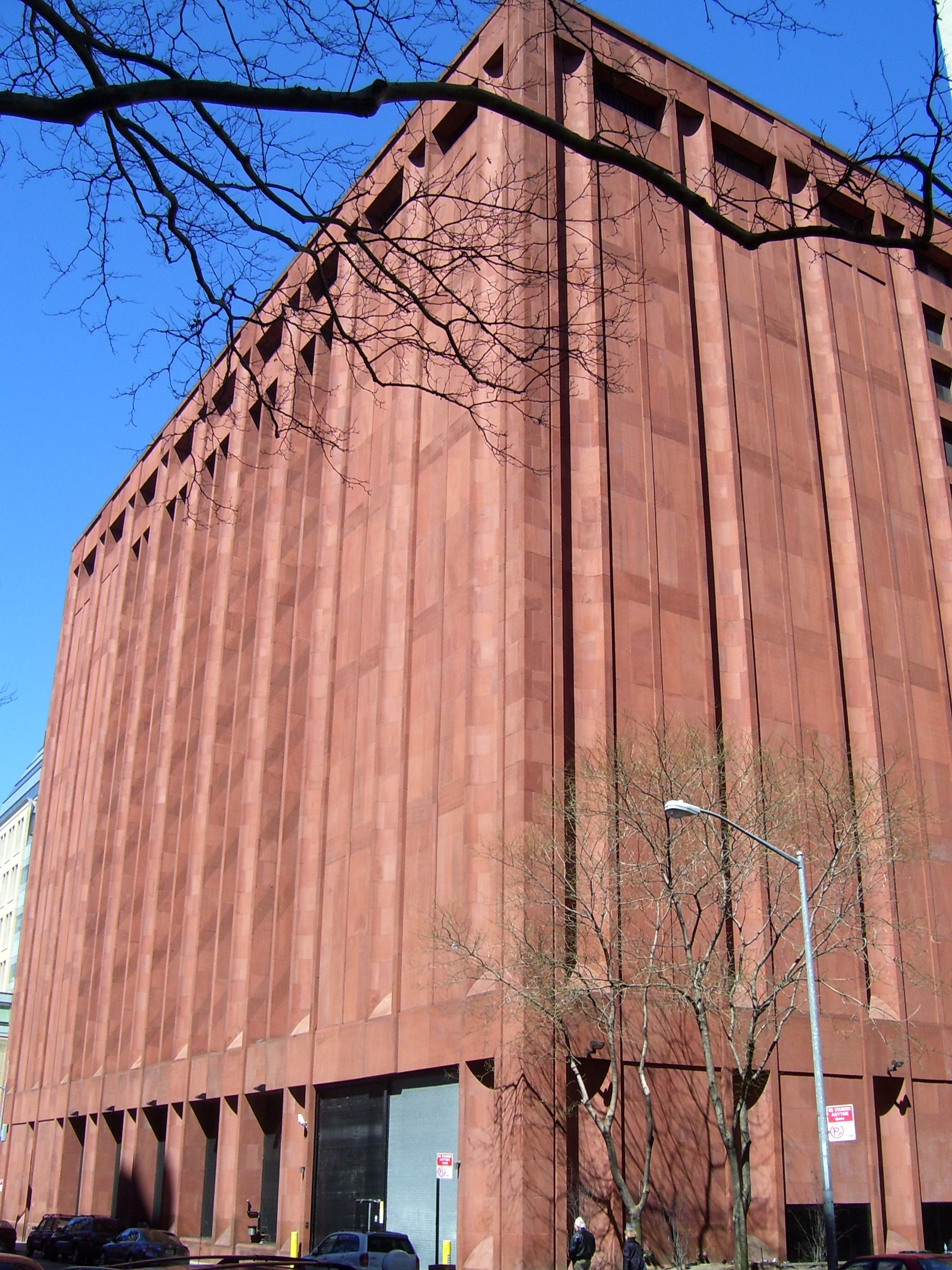
- The south facade of the Bobst Library, along West 3rd Street

General information
- Type: Library
- Location: 70 Washington Square South, New York City (Greenwich Village, Manhattan), New York 10012, United States
- Coordinates: 40°43′46″N 73°59′50″W
- Completed: September 12, 1973; 53 years ago
- Opened: September 12, 1973; 53 years ago
- Owner: New York University

Technical details
- Floor count: 12
- Floor area: 425,000 square feet (39,500 m^{2})

Design and construction
- Architects: Philip Johnson and Richard Foster

Collection
- Size: 3.3 million volumes, 20,000 journals, and over 3.5 million microforms

Access and use
- Circulation: Almost one million books annually

The Elmer Holmes Bobst Library (/boʊbst/ BOHBST), often referred to simply as Bobst Library or just Bobst, is the main library at New York University (NYU) in Lower Manhattan, New York City. The library is located at 70 Washington Square South between LaGuardia Place and the Schwartz pedestrian plaza, across from the southeast corner of Washington Square Park and next to Gould Plaza.

Opened on September 12, 1973, Bobst Library is named after its benefactor, Elmer Holmes Bobst, who gave US$11.5 million toward its completion. Bobst – a philanthropist who made his money in the pharmaceutical industry, and a confidant of U.S. President Richard Nixon – was a long-time trustee at New York University.

== Description ==
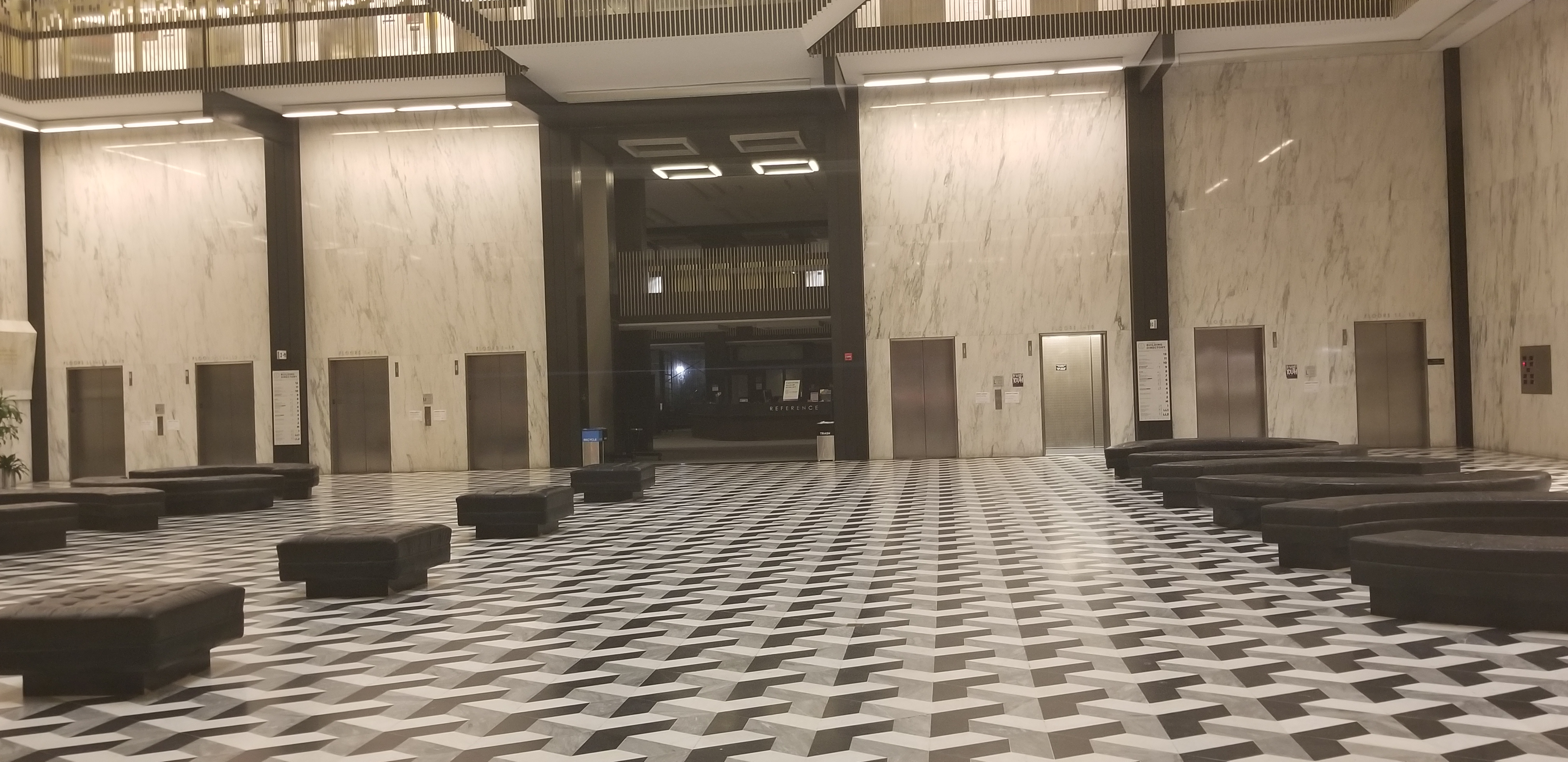
Bobst Library's lobby

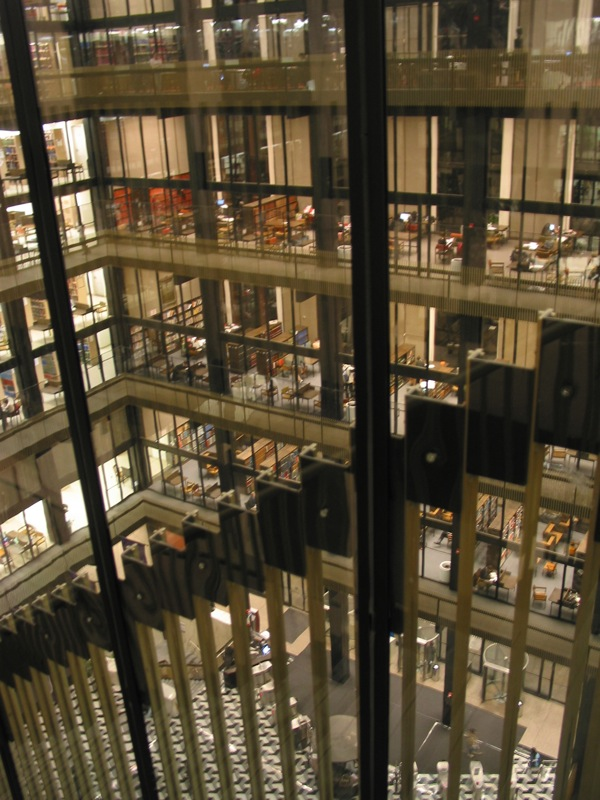
A view of the interior of Bobst

The library, built in 1972, is NYU's largest library and one of the largest academic libraries in the U.S. Designed by Philip Johnson and Richard Foster, the 12-story, 425,000 square feet (39,500 m^{2}) structure is the flagship of an eleven-library, 5.9 million-volume system.

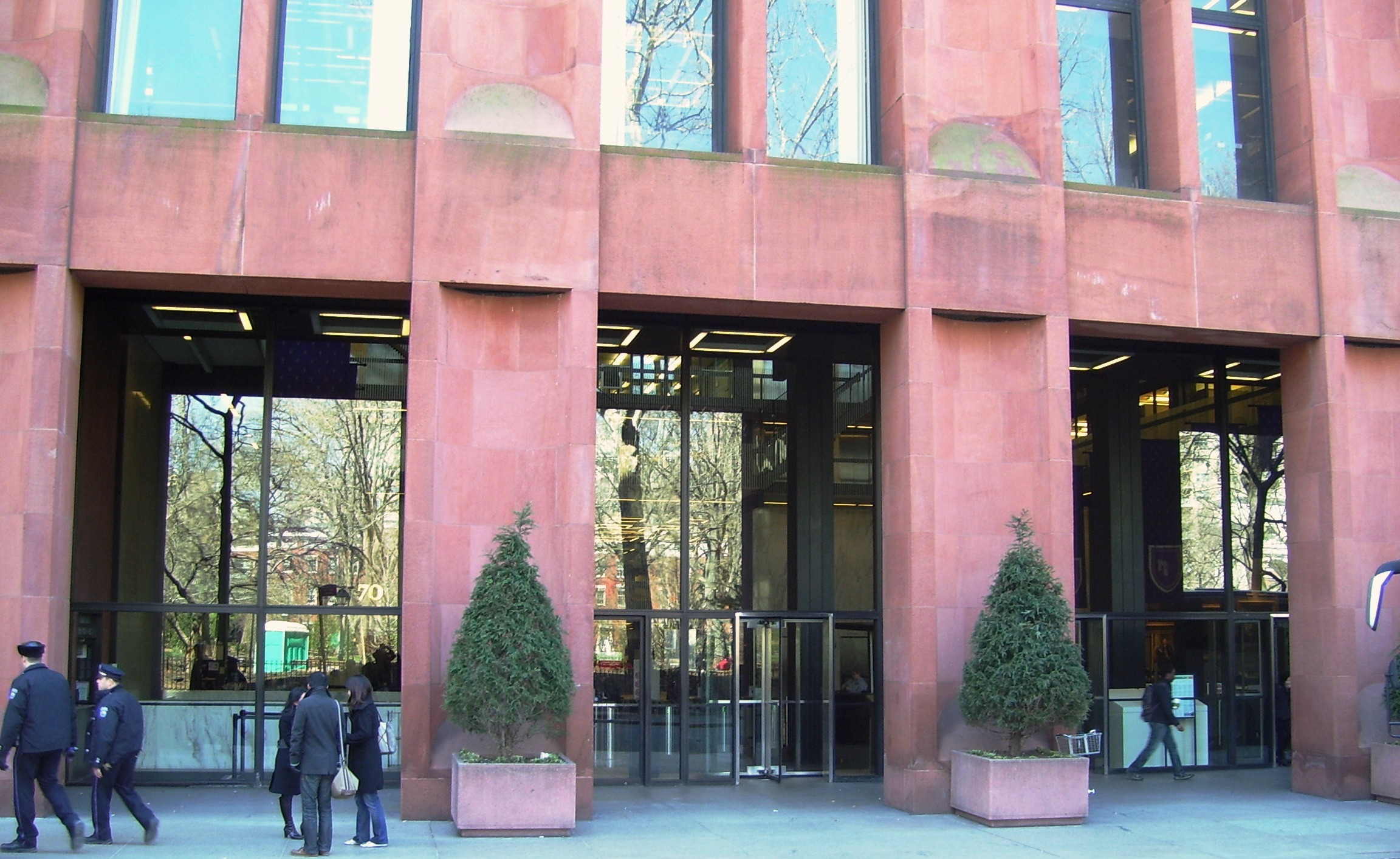
The entrance to the library on Washington Square South

Before its construction, the library was the subject of community protests led by Greenwich Village activists Jane Jacobs, Ruth Wittenberg, and Verna Small. Those opposed to the library project claimed it was too big for its building site, and that the tall building would cast a large shadow over neighboring Washington Square Park, obstructing sunlight from public spaces.

The library houses more than 3.3 million volumes, 20,000 journals, and over 3.5 million microforms; and provides access to thousands of electronic resources in the forms of licensed databases, e-journals, and other formats both on-site and to the university community around the world via the Internet. The library is visited by more than 6,500 users per day, and circulates almost one million books annually.

Gifts from Mamdouha S. Bobst and Kevin Brine made possible a significant renovation of Bobst Library's Mezzanine, First Floor and two Lower Levels which was completed in 2005. The library provided text computer terminals for catalog search in the library until the terminals were replaced by PCs with Internet access in 2008.

The library houses several distinct special collections departments, including the Fales Library, the Tamiment Library and Robert F. Wagner Archives, and the University Archives of NYU. On the north side, on even floors, are large, double-height study rooms featuring floor-to-ceiling windows overlooking Washington Square Park.

== Notable events ==
=== Suicides ===
In late 2003, the library was the site of two suicides. In separate incidents, students jumped from the open-air crosswalks inside the library and fell to the stereogram-patterned marble floor below.

After the second suicide, the university installed Plexiglas barricades on each level and along the stairways to prevent further jumping. In 2009, a third student jumped to his death from the tenth floor, apparently scaling the plexiglas barricade.

The library has since added floor-to-ceiling metal barriers to prevent any future suicide attempts. The barrier is made of randomly perforated aluminum screens that evoke the zeros and ones of a digital waterfall.

=== Bobst Boy ===
Bobst Boy is the nickname of Steven Stanzak (born January 25, 1984), a New York University student who spent eight months living in the basement of one of the school's libraries, Bobst Library from September 2003 to April 2004. Before living in the Bobst library, Stanzak was an ordinary student living on loans and part-time jobs, without financial assistance from his parents. In September 2003, he found that his NYU scholarship, four jobs, and private loans would cover his tuition costs, but he could not get enough loans to cover housing. He refused to drop out or transfer to a cheaper university, choosing instead to live in the library. Stanzak quickly grew tired of answering peoples' questions about life in the library, and posted a Q&A online, which eventually grew into the blog and web site, and Stanzak developed an underground fan following on NYU's campus.

The Washington Square News, one of NYU's student papers, was told of Stanzak's situation and asked to do a profile on him. At first Stanzak refused, fearing how NYU would react to the situation. However, once Stanzak was told that the article would only be printed with his consent, he agreed to an interview. In April 2004, just before the release of the news article, an NYU dean was told of Stanzak's situation, and requested a meeting. At the meeting, the dean told Stanzak that his initiative was remarkable, but that he could no longer live in the library, and Stanzak was provided free NYU housing for the last few weeks of classes. The day the profile was published, reporters started calling Stanzak, and he became an overnight celebrity. Stanzak received widespread media attention, appearing on Good Morning America on April 29.

Stanzak continued to receive financial assistance from NYU until graduation, and no longer updates his blog or web site. After his time in Bobst library, he became a Resident Assistant at NYU's Lafayette Street Residence, in Chinatown.

After graduation from NYU, Stanzak later attended Indiana University Bloomington, where he received an M.A. (2009) and Ph.D. (2014), both in folklore. He subsequently became a software engineer; among other projects he developed a web application for New Yorkers to apply for rental assistance.

== Name ==
In 2016, several student organizations sent a list of demands to the NYU Board of Trustees. One of these demands called for a name-change due to Elmer Holmes Bobst's alleged history of antisemitism.
