= Kenneth M. Golden =

American applied mathematician

Kenneth Golden
- Education: Dartmouth College; New York University
- Known for: Mathematics of Sea Ice
- Awards: Fellow of the Electromagnetics Academy (1996); SIAM Fellow (2011); AMS Fellow (2013); Fellow of the Explorers Club (2014)
- Scientific career
- Fields: Applied mathematics Geomathematics; Composite Materials
- Workplaces: Rutgers University; Princeton University; University of Utah
- Thesis: Bounds for Effective Parameters of Multicomponent Media by Analytic Continuation (1984)
- Doctoral advisor: George C. Papanicolaou
- Website: https://www.math.utah.edu/~golden/

Kenneth Morgan Golden (born September 30, 1958) is an American applied mathematician and Distinguished Professor of Mathematics at the University of Utah, where he is also an adjunct professor of Biomedical Engineering. He works on modeling complex materials with a focus on sea ice. Golden has been on nineteen expeditions to study the physics and biology of sea ice in the Arctic and Antarctic.

== Education and training ==
Golden's interest in sea ice began in high school, studying satellite images of Antarctic sea ice with Jay Zwally at NASA's Goddard Space Flight Center. While majoring in math and physics at Dartmouth College, he worked at the US Army Cold Regions Research and Engineering Laboratory from 1977 to 1980 with Steve Ackley on measuring sea ice thickness with radar, treating sea ice as a composite of pure ice with brine inclusions. This work led to his 1984 Ph.D. from NYU in Mathematics with George Papanicolaou on the transport properties of composite materials.

Golden studied diffusion processes and quasiperiodic media as a National Science Foundation (NSF) Mathematical Sciences Postdoctoral Fellow with Joel Lebowitz at Rutgers University. As an assistant professor of Mathematics at Princeton University from 1987 to 1991, Golden continued working in mathematical physics, and then moved to the University of Utah as an associate professor in 1991.

== Research and career ==
As a material, sea ice exhibits complex composite structure on many length scales. Golden's interests range from the brine microstructure to ice pack dynamics on the scale of the Arctic Ocean, and from sea ice algae to polar bears. For example, the fluid permeability of sea ice, which depends on the porous microstructure, regulates the evolution of melt ponds on the surface of Arctic sea ice as well as fluxes of nutrients that fuel algae blooms. Golden and colleagues found that sea ice has a percolation threshold, a critical porosity or temperature that must be exceeded for brine pathways to form and fluid to flow, and used percolation theory to accurately predict the permeability. The melt ponds determine sea ice reflectance or albedo, a key parameter in climate modeling. As the ponds grow and complexify, they undergo a transition in fractal geometry. The 100 year old Ising model, originally developed to understand magnetic materials, was adapted to accurately predict melt pond geometry. These works are improving projections of Earth's sea ice covers and the ecosystems they support, and represent principal examples of how statistical physics is contributing to sea ice modeling and prediction.

Golden is interested not only in how the physics of sea ice affects the life it hosts, but in how the presence of life impacts sea ice. For example, sea ice algae secrete exopolymeric substances to help them live in their extreme surroundings. But this alters the brine microstructure and the fluid permeability. On the other hand, sea ice is locally highly variable. Parameters in models of algal dynamics must be treated as random variables. Such models have been solved using methods of uncertainty quantification.

Sea ice microstructure shares similarities with many natural and artificial materials. Modeling sea ice often advances other fields. Examples of this cross pollination include developing new materials with exotic properties such as twisted bilayer composites, a theory of electromagnetic transport in polycrystalline media, and a novel way of monitoring osteoporosis.

During his years at the University of Utah, Golden has led several federally funded, multi-disciplinary, multi-institution projects, as well as successful efforts to hire faculty working in the mathematics of materials and related areas. He has mentored over 100 young researchers, from high school and undergraduate to Ph.D. and postdoctoral, with many assisting in field experiments in Antarctica and the Arctic. Golden has given over 500 invited lectures on six continents, including four presentations to the U.S. Congress, and won awards for teaching, mentoring, and science communication.

== Media and movies ==
Golden's research and public lectures have been covered by media around the world, including Science, Scientific American, Physics Today, Popular Mechanics, and the BBC. He's been interviewed on radio, television, and online, and featured in short films produced by the NSF, the Society for Industrial and Applied Mathematics, NBC News, and the University of Utah.

In a San Diego Tribune article about Golden's Porter Public Lectures at the 2013 Joint Math Meetings, Golden was given the nickname "mathematical Indiana Jones," which has also appeared in various other articles about his career.

== Honors ==
- 1981 – 84 Hertz Foundation Fellow, NYU
- 1989 Excellence in Teaching Award, Princeton Engineering Council, Princeton University
- 1996 Fellow of the Electromagnetics Academy for "extraordinary accomplishments in electromagnetics"
- 2007 University of Utah Distinguished Teaching Award
- 2009 SIAM Invited Address, Joint Math Meetings (AMS-MAA-SIAM), Washington D.C.
- 2010 Houghton Lecturer, Department of Earth, Atmospheric and Planetary Sciences, MIT
- 2011 Fellow of the Society for Industrial and Applied Mathematics (SIAM) for "extraordinary interdisciplinary work on the mathematics of sea ice"
- 2012 Myriad Faculty Award for Research Excellence, for fostering undergraduate research and providing learning experiences for students, University of Utah
- 2012 University of Utah Distinguished Scholarly & Creative Research Award
- 2013 AMS-MAA-SIAM Porter Public Lecture, Joint Mathematics Meetings, San Diego
- 2013 Guest of Honor, Institut des Hautes Études Scientifiques (IHÉS) Gala, Mathematics: Mind of the Earth, hosted by the French Ambassador to the US, Pierre Hotel, New York City
- 2013 Inaugural Fellow of the American Mathematical Society
- 2014 United States Coast Guard Arctic Service Medal
- 2014 Fellow of the Explorers Club
- 2022 – 24 Inaugural Recipient of the University of Utah Presidential Societal Impact Scholar Award
- 2023 Calvin S. and JeNeal N. Hatch Prize in Teaching, University of Utah
