= Alice Anderson =

French-British artist (born 1972)

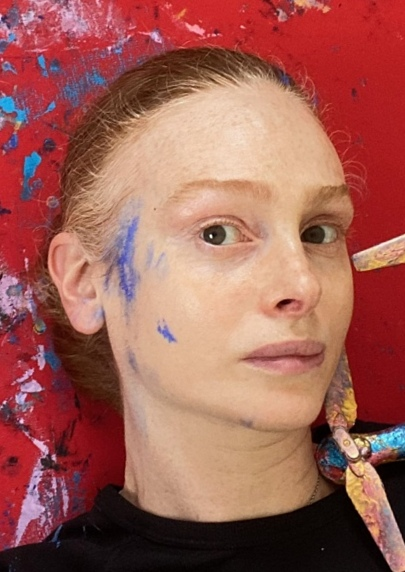
- Anderson in 2022
- Born: 1972 (age 53–54); Alfortville, France
- Education: Goldsmiths, University of London, École nationale supérieure des Beaux-Arts
- Known for: Sculpture, Performance, Film
- Website: alice-anderson.org

Alice Anderson (born 1972) is a French artist who studied at the École Nationale Supérieure des Beaux-Arts of Paris and Goldsmiths University of London. Associated with the performance Art movement Anderson works primarily with technological objects. She creates paintings by dancing with VR masks, laptops, drones, mobile phones, printers, speakers and sculptures by using an eco-friendly copper-coloured wire (not copper material) symbolising neuronal and technological connections of the internet debut.

== Work ==
Anderson questions our relationship to nature and the body in the age of AI. Fascinated by computers and the development of the World Wide Web in 1989, she began collecting used technological objects, electronic devices, circuits boards and specially RAM, the computer's short-term memory, where the data of the processor is used and stored. Painting since an early age, Anderson could integrate the Beaux-Arts Paris in Christian Boltanski studio. At school in 1999, she continued her research on "objects encapsulating memory" and created a diary of her childhood filmed in video.

Anderson's main work only started to build up in 2011 after the rupture with the video work, which included maquettes, and props. Anderson separated from it considering it a work of youth after dismantling an alarm clock and finding a copper bobbin in 2010. Anderson unexpectedly developed her own weaving technique based on the repetitive movement of encircling an object with an eco-friendly copper-coloured wire which symbolises neuronal and technological connections of the internet debut. For Anderson, the gestures of winding wire around objects are performative acts of "Memorisations". Anderson puts forward the concept of memorisation (and not wrapping or enveloping) to describe the gesture of encircling an object with wire. As she begins to know the object, she memorises the relationship with it.

In 2015, she exhibited her first memorised objects in copper-coloured wire at the Wellcome Collection in London. Jonathan Jones of The Guardian described the work as "glutinous in the memory. The reason it works is because she takes the whole thing so stupendously seriously. This is passionate, obsessive, intensely concentrated work." Visitors were asked to help the artist record a Ford Mustang in wire through a collective sculpture.

Anderson's first large-scale project using copper thread was "Rituals" at the Freud Museum in London, where she represented on a large scale "the" original gesture of surrounding an object with 30.000 metres of thread in "Housebound" (2011), which replicated the entire length of digital cables found within the site. Abstracting the innards of architecture to its digital nervous system, Anderson proceeded to apply this action to foundational structures within architecture: measuring, replicating, deconstructing and appropriating transitional structures such as stairs, windows and lifts housed within the host building. Anderson creates her own DATA as a poetic response to the "Big Data". Through the process of "memorising" the structures with copper wire, the elements are printed, contorted and displaced, often to points beyond immediate recognition. This body of works within Anderson's practice is termed "Architectures Data".

In September 2012, Anderson founded Alice Anderson's Collective Travelling Studio after a debut performance at the Whitechapel Gallery in London. In 2013, Anderson's sculptures were featured at the 55th Venice Biennale. In 2015, she participated in solo exhibitions at Wellcome Collection London and Espace Culturel Louis Vuitton, Paris. In 2016, Anderson installed a series of permanent sculptures at the Eiffel Historical Building in Paris, as well as created a "181 km walk" performative sculpture symbolising a biosphere and a "Google Bobbin" linking the whole planet in a group show at the Saatchi Gallery, in London.

Her recycled and assembled technological objects named "Spiritual Machines" are referencing the book "The Age of Spiritual Machines: When Computers Exceed Human Intelligence" by inventor and futurist Ray Kurzweil about artificial intelligence and the future course of humanity.

In 2017, Anderson exhibited at the Royal Academy of Arts, London and began a series of performances at Centre Pompidou, who acquired her performance-generated sculpture, "Floorboards Data", for their permanent collection in 2018. In 2019, the important step for Anderson was her residency at the Atelier Calder, where she created a new range of paintings and sculptures and notably her "Geometric Dances". In 2020, Alice Anderson has been nominated for the Prix Marcel Duchamp and won the SAM Art Prize for Contemporary Art in 2023.
