= George C. Papanicolaou =

Greek-American mathematician (born 1943)

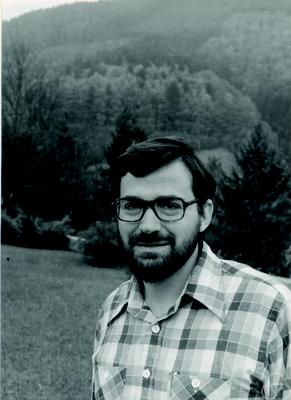
- Papanicolaou in 1976
- Born: 23 January 1943 (age 83); Athens, Greece
- Education: Union College (BEE) New York University (MS, PhD)
- Scientific career
- Fields: Mathematics
- Workplaces: Stanford University
- Doctoral advisor: Joseph Keller
- Doctoral students: Liliana Borcea; Russel E. Caflisch; Kenneth M. Golden

George C. Papanicolaou (/ˌpæpəˈnɪkəlaʊ/; born January 23, 1943) is a Greek-American mathematician who specializes in applied and computational mathematics, partial differential equations, and stochastic processes. He is currently the Robert Grimmett Professor in Mathematics at Stanford University.

== Biography ==
Papanicolaou was born on January 23, 1943, in Athens, Greece. He received his B.E.E. from Union College and his M.S. and Ph.D. from New York University (NYU) in 1969. His PhD thesis, supervised by Joseph Bishop Keller was entitled "On Stochastic Differential Equations and Applications". At NYU, he started out as an assistant professor in 1969 before moving up to associate professor in 1973 and finally professor in 1976. Later, in 1993, he relocated to Stanford.

He has had 42 doctoral students and 220 descendants. He is married, with three children.

== Publications ==
Papanicolaou has more than 250 publications on a wide range of topics, including imaging, communications and time reversal, waves in random media, convection-diffusion, nonlinear waves, high contrast materials, mathematical finance, and homogenization.

== Recognition ==
George Papanicolaou is a member of the National Academy of Sciences, and he is a Fellow of the American Academy of Arts and Sciences, the American Mathematical Society (AMS), and the Society for Industrial and Applied Mathematics (SIAM). He was a plenary speaker at the International Congress of Mathematicians in 1998 and the International Congress on Industrial and Applied Mathematics (ICIAM) in 2003. He was awarded a Sloan Research Fellowship (1974), a Guggenheim Fellowship (1983), the von Neumann Lectureship from SIAM (2006), the William Benter Prize in Applied Mathematics (2010), the Gibbs Lectureship of the AMS (2011), and the Lagrange Prize from ICIAM (2019). He received an Honorary Doctor of Science, University of Athens in 1987 and a Doctor Honoris Causa, University of Paris VII in 2011.

== Books ==
- "Asymptotic Analysis for Periodic Structures", Alain Bensoussan, Jacques-Louis Lions and George Papanicolaou, North Holland (1978), Reprinted by the American Mathematical Society (2011).
- "Derivatives in Financial Markets with Stochastic Volatility", Jean-Pierre Fouque, George Papanicolaou and K. Ronnie Sircar, Cambridge University Press (2000).
- "Wave Propagation and Time Reversal in Randomly Layered Media", Jean-Pierre Fouque, Josselin Garnier, George Papanicolaou and Knut Solna, Springer (2007).
- "Multiscale Stochastic Volatility for Equity, Interest-Rate and Credit Derivatives", Jean-Pierre Fouque, George Papanicolaou, K. Ronnie Sircar and Knut Solna, Cambridge University Press (2011).
- "Passive Imaging with Ambient Noise", Josselin Garnier and George Papanicolaou, Cambridge University Press (2016).
