= Elmer Holmes Bobst =

American businessman and philanthropist

Elmer Holmes Bobst (December 16, 1884 – August 2, 1978) was an American businessman and philanthropist who worked in the pharmaceutical industry.

== Early life and career ==
Bobst was born in Lititz, Pennsylvania. He aspired to become a doctor, but instead, he taught himself pharmacology. After his wife Ethel composed his interview letter, he became manager and treasurer of the Hoffman-LaRoche Chemical Works by 1920. When Bobst retired from the company in 1944, he was one of the nation's highest paid corporate executives. In 1945 he took charge of the ailing William Warner Company (later Warner–Lambert) and he remained board chairman.

Bobst had close connections to President Dwight Eisenhower, and was also a close friend of President Richard Nixon, contributing generously to their campaigns and helping to guide Nixon's career. The Nixons joined Bobst and his two granddaughters Anne and Stephanie for many visits to Spring Lake, New Jersey. In 1968, Bobst became a White House advisor on health issues. Philanthropic pursuits were also important to Bobst, particularly cancer research and education.

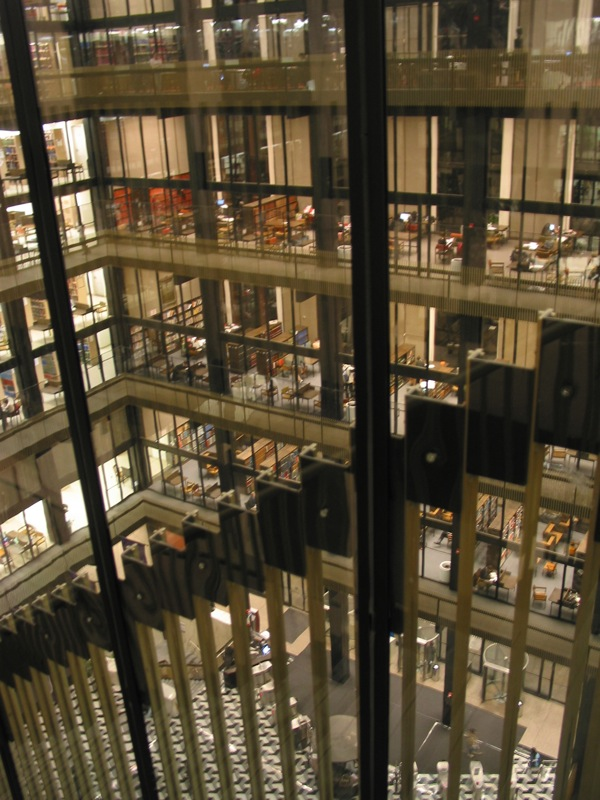
A view of the interior of Bobst Library

== Legacy ==
Bobst had one son Elmer Walton Bobst (d. 1964) with his wife of 50 years, Ethel Rose Bobst (d. 1954). His son, E. Walton Bobst, former president of Bobst Pharmaceutical, had two daughters, Anne Bobst-Highley and Stephanie Bobst Haymes Vanden Heuvel.

In April 1961 Bobst married Mamdouha As-Sayyid, who was a member of the Lebanese delegation to the United Nations, and decades his junior. He bought her many fine jewels, including a diamond tiara formerly the property of Queen Geraldine of Albania. In 1988, Mamdouha Bobst donated the records and personal effects of her late husband to the Fales Library at New York University. Mamdouha Bobst died in 2015.

Bobst was also known as an anti-Semite, writing in a letter to Nixon, “Jews have troubled the world from the very beginning. If this beloved country of ours ever falls apart, the blame rightly should be attributed to the malicious action of Jews in complete control of our communications.”

=== Elmer Holmes Bobst Library ===
Bobst gave $11 million towards the completion and opening of New York University's Bobst Library. Opened on September 12, 1973, the Elmer Holmes Bobst Library is the main library and anchor building at NYU. Located at the Southeast corner of Washington Square Park, it is named after its benefactor. Bobst was a long time trustee at NYU.
