= Andrea =

- Pronunciation: /ˈændriə, ˈɑːn-/ A(H)N-dree-ə, /ɑːnˈdreɪ.ə/ ahn-DRAY-ə; Italian: [anˈdrɛːa]
- Gender: Female (most languages); Male (most cases, Albanian, Italian and Romansh)
- Language: Greek aner, andros, "man" (i.e. adult male)

Origin
- Meaning: 'manly'

Other names
- See also: Andre, Andreas, Andrew, Andy/Andie, Adrian, Andrey

Andrea is a given name which is common worldwide, typically female but also used for males in some cultures.

== Origin of the name ==
The name derives from the Greek word ἀνήρ (anēr), genitive ἀνδρός (andrós), that refers to man as opposed to woman (whereas man in the sense of human being is ἄνθρωπος, ánthropos). The original male Greek name, Andréas, represents the hypocoristic, with endearment functions, of male Greek names composed with the andr- prefix, like Androgeos (man of the earth), Androcles (man of glory), Andronikos (man of victory).

In the year 2006, it was the third most popular name in Italy with 3.1% of newborns. It is part of the Italian male names ending in a, some others being Elia (Elias), Enea (Aeneas), Luca (Lucas), Mattia (Matthias), Nicola (Nicholas), Tobia (Tobias). In recent and past times, it has also been used on occasion as a female name in Italy and in Spain, where it is considered the legitimate feminine form of Andrés/Andreo/Andreu (Andrew). Outside of Italy, the name is generally considered a female name.

== Usage ==
- In Czech, Slovak, Polish, Slovenian, Dutch, English, French, German, Hungarian, Indonesian, Scandinavian languages and Spanish, Andrea is a feminine name. Masculine forms are Andrej, Ondřej, Andrzej, Anže, Andrew, Andreas, András, Andrey, Andreo, Andrés, Anders, Andries or Andre. However, many Swiss men regardless of first language are also named Andrea, if followed by a masculine middle name to comply with Swiss naming law.
- In Albanian Andrea is a masculine name; its native form is Ndrea.
- In Romansh Andrea is also a masculine name.
- In Italian, Andrea is primarily a masculine name. Some men of Italian descent, from countries where Andrea is feminine, bear the name.
- In Bulgarian Andrea (Андреа) is used as the feminine form of "Andrei".
- In Croatia, Serbia and Slovenia, Andrea is a feminine name; Andreja can be used as female name, while Andrija, Andro and Andrej are masculine forms. The only exception is Istria, where Andrea is a male name.
- In Romania Andreea is a feminine name and it is written with an extra "e". However, the feminine variation Andrea is also used. Andrea as etymon means knitting needle in Romanian. Andrei is the masculine form.
- Andréia is the most common Portuguese spelling of this name, although Andréa is also used in Brazilian Portuguese. The masculine form is André.
- In Dutch, Andrea is used as a female name, although the variant Andrée is found in French.
- In Spanish, Andrea and variations spelled Andreina and Andressa are used as female variants for Andrey, Andreo, and Andrés.
- In Basque, Andrea and Andere exist as female names. Two etymons merge in the former: the most widespread form with a Greek root, 'man', and the Basque-Aquitanian ancient form "andere(a)", present-day "andere(a)" and "andre(a)", 'madam', 'lady' (used mainly as title, e.g. "Andramari", 'Lady/Virgin Mary'), as opposed to "jaun", 'lord'. In popular usage, it can ultimately mean 'adult woman'.
- In Catalan, Andrea is used as the feminine form of "Andreu".
- In Asturian, Andrea is the feminine form of "Andrés".

== Notable people ==
=== Women ===
- Andrea Aagot (born 2000), Danish handball player
- Andrea Ablasser (born 1983), German immunologist
- Andrea Abrams, American anthropologist
- Andrea Abreu (born 1995), Spanish writer
- Andrea Absolonová (1976–2004), Czech model and diver
- Andrea Acciaioli, Italian noblewoman
- Andrea Ackerman, American artist, theorist and writer
- Andrea Accordi, Italian chef
- Andrea Adams (1946–1995), British journalist
- Andrea Aldana (born 1989), Guatemalan sailor
- Andrea Alfaro, American New Zealand aquaculture and marine ecology academic
- Andrea Alfiler (born 1979), American soccer player
- Andrea Alföldi (born 1964), Hungarian race walker
- Andrea Allan (born 1946), American actress
- Andrea Amaya (born 2003), Salvadoran footballer
- Andrea Ammon (born 1958), German physician
- Andrea Amort, Austrian author and historian
- Andrea Anacan, New Zealand karateka
- Andrea Anders (born 1975), American actress
- Andrea Anderson (born 1977), American sprinter
- Andrea Anderson-Mason, Canadian politician
- Andrea Andersson-Tay (born 1988), Swedish politician
- Andrea Andreen (1888–1972), Swedish physician, pacifist and feminist
- Andrea Apolo, American medical oncologist
- Andrea Ar Gouilh (born 1935), French singer
- Andrea Arlington, American model, television personality, and life coach
- Andrea Armada (born 2000), Venezuelan karateka
- Andrea Armani, American chemical engineer
- Andrea Armstrong (lawyer), American lawyer and legal scholar
- Andrea Armstrong (born 1982), former American collegiate basketball player
- Andrea Arnold (born 1961), English film director and former actress
- Andrea Arpaci-Dusseau, American computer scientist
- Andrea Arsović (born 1987), Serbian sport shooter
- Andrea Árting (1891–1988), Faroese politician and trade union leader
- Andrea Ashworth, English writer and academic
- Andrea Ávila (born 1970), Argentine long and triple jumper
- Andrea Bailey (born 1972), American politician
- Andrea Bain, Canadian television host and journalist
- Andrea Baker, American actress
- Andrea Bakula (born 1981), Croatian table tennis player
- Andrea Ball, American political aide
- Andrea Balladares (born 1987), Chilean politician
- Andrea Bang, Canadian actress
- Andrea Barata Ribeiro, Brazilian film producer
- Andrea Barber (born 1976), American actress
- Andrea Barbieri (born 1965), Argentine television and film actress
- Andrea Barnet, American author
- Andrea Barnó (born 1980), Spanish handball player
- Andrea Barócsi (born 1975), Hungarian canoeist
- Andrea Barrett (born 1954), American novelist and short story writer
- Andrea Barrientos (born 1989), Bolivian senator for Cochabamba
- Andrea Bartha, Hungarian set and costume designer
- Andrea Barthwell (born 1953), American federal civil servant and Illinois political hopeful
- Andrea Baumert (born 1967), German high jumper
- Andrea Beaty, American children's author
- Andrea Becali (born 2004), Cuban swimmer
- Andrea Becerra (born 2000), Mexican archer
- Andrea Beck (born 1956), Canadian children's writer
- Andrea Bédard (born 1963), Canadian alpine skier
- Andrea Begley (born 1987), Irish singer
- Andrea Bekić (born 1965), Croatian diplomat
- Andrea Belag, American painter
- Andrea Beleska (born 1994), Macedonian handball player
- Andrea Bell, New Zealand architect
- Andréa Belliger, Swiss theologian
- Andréa Beltrão (born 1963), Brazilian actress and playwright
- Andrea Bendewald, American actress
- Andrea L. Berez-Kroeker, American linguist
- Andrea Berg (born 1966), German singer
- Andrea Berg (born 1981), German volleyball player
- Andrea Berger (born 1970), American tennis player
- Andrea Berlin, archaeologist
- Andrea Berloff (born 1974), American screenwriter
- Andrea Berntzen (born 1998), Norwegian actress and student
- Andrea Berrino (born 1994), Argentine swimmer
- Andrea Bertozzi, American mathematician
- Andrea Betzner (born 1966), German tennis player
- Andrea Bieger (born 1959), German gymnast
- Andrea Blackett (born 1976), Barbadian hurdler
- Andrea Blackwell (born 1962), Canadian basketball player
- Andrea Blair, New Zealand geothermal consultant
- Andrea Blanch, American photographer
- Andrea Blanco-Redondo, Spanish photonics engineer
- Andrea Blas (born 1992), Spanish water polo player
- Andrea Bleicher, Swiss journalist
- Andrea Bliss (born 1980), Jamaican athlete
- Andrea Blum, American artist
- Andrea Boardman (born 1967), English television presenter
- Andrea Bocskor (born 1978), Hungarian politician
- Andrea Bogorová (born 2000), Slovak footballer
- Andrea Böhm (born 1961), German journalist and author
- Andrea Bölk (born 1968), German handball player
- Andrea Bolley, Canadian painter
- Andrea Boltz (born 1969), Mexican rower
- Andrea Bonilla (born 1978), Bolivian politician
- Andrea Bonilla (runner) (born 1986), Ecuadorian long-distance runner
- Andrea Booher, American FEMA photographer
- Andrea Boquete (born 1990), Argentine basketball player
- Andrea Bordeaux (born 1987), American actress and model
- Andrea Borrell (born 1963), Cuban basketball player
- Andrea Bosman (born 1979), Dutch cyclist
- Andrea Botero Coy (born 1988), Colombian cyclist
- Andrea Botez (born 2002), Romanian-Canadian chess player
- Andrea Bottner, American lawyer
- Andrea Bouma (born 1999), Dutch sprinter
- Andrea Bowen (born 1990), American actress
- Andrea Bowers, American visual artist
- Andrea Bowman, Saint Vincent and the Grenadines politician and diplomat
- Andrea Brachfeld, American jazz flutist
- Andrea Brady (born 1974), American poet and lecturer
- Andrea Bræin Hovig (born 1973), Norwegian actress
- Andrea Bramhall (born 1979), British writer
- Andrea Brand (born 1959), molecular biologist
- Andrea Brändli (born 1997), Swiss ice hockey player
- Andrea Bréard, German historian of mathematics
- Andrea Breder (born 1964), German high jumper
- Andrea Marie Breiling, contemporary painter
- Andrea Breth (born 1952), German theatre and opera director
- Andrea Brewster (born 1982), Irish sailor
- Andrea Brillantes (born 2003), Filipina actress
- Andréa Maria Britto (born 1973), Brazilian shot putter
- Andrea Britton, British singer
- Andrea van de Broeke, Dutch cricketer
- Andrea Bronfman (1945–2006), American philanthropist
- Andrea Brooks (born 1989), Canadian actress
- Andrea Barnwell Brownlee, American art curator
- Andrea Bruce (born 1955), Jamaican high jumper
- Andrea Brühlmann (born 1984), Swiss sport shooter
- Andrea Brunsendorf, German-born gardener, horticulturalist and landscaper
- Andrea Brymer, Scottish television presenter
- Andrea Buchanan (1955–1982), American tennis player
- Andrea Budošová (born 1980), Slovak footballer
- Andrea Bunjes (born 1976), German hammer thrower
- Andrea Burk (born 1982), Canadian rugby footballer
- Andréa Burns (born 1971), American actress
- Andrea Bussmann, Canadian film director
- Andrea Büttner (born 1972), German artist
- Andrea Byrne, British journalist
- Andrea Cabral (born 1959), American lawyer
- Andrea Cagan, American writer, biographer and ghostwriter
- Andrea Calderwood, British film and television producer
- Andrea Callard, American painter
- Andrea Campbell (born 1982), American politician
- Andrea Canning (born 1972), Canadian-American broadcast journalist
- Andrea Cardona (born 1982), Guatemalan mountaineer
- Andrea Carlson (chef), Canadian chef and restaurateur
- Andrea Carlson, American painter
- Andrea Carroll (born 1946), American singer
- Andrea Carroll (soprano), American soprano
- Andrea Casasnovas (born 1987), Spanish alpine skier
- Andrea Catherwood (born 1967), Northern Irish television presenter and journalist
- Andrea Catsimatidis (born 1990), American politician
- Andrea Cedrón (born 1993), Peruvian swimmer
- Andrea Černá (born 1977), Czech actress
- Andrea Češková (born 1971), Czech MEP
- Andrea Chandler, American farmer, writer and sailor
- Andrea Chapela, Mexican writer
- Andrea Chaplin (born 1964), Australian fencer
- Andrea Chen (born 1987), Taiwanese actress and model
- Andrea Cheng (1957–2015), Hungarian-American author
- Andrea Chiuchich (born 1969), Argentine fencer
- Andrea Chung (born 1978), American artist
- Andrea Clark, African-American photographer
- Andrea Clausen (politician), British-born Falkland Islands politician
- Andrea Clausen (born 1959), German actress
- Andrea Clearfield, American composer
- Andrea Cochran, American landscape architect
- Andrea Cole, Canadian Paralympic swimmer
- Andrea Congreaves (born 1970), English basketball player
- Andrea Conte (born 1941), First Lady of Tennessee (2003–2011)
- A. J. Cook (born 1978), Canadian actress
- Andrea Coore (born 1969), English long jumper
- Andrea Coote (born 1951), Australian parliamentarian
- Andrea Cornwall, English professor of anthropology and development
- Andrea Corr (born 1974), Irish musician
- Andrea Corral (born 2008), Spanish rhythmic gymnast
- Andrea Coss (born 1960), Australian rower
- Andrea Čović (born 1993), Croatian handball player
- Andrea Cunningham, American businessperson
- Andrea Czanik (born 1979), Slovak handball player
- Andréa Dacourt (born 2005), French association footballer
- Andrea Dahmen (born 1939), German actress
- Andrea Dakó (born 1972), Hungarian badminton player
- Andrea Dalen (born 1992), Norwegian ice hockey player
- Andrea Dalessandro, American politician
- Andrea Dallaway (born 1970), British sprint canoer
- Andrea Daly (born 1965), New Zealand jeweler and arts teacher
- Andrea Dalzell, American nurse
- Andrea Damiani (born 1985), French footballer
- Andrea Danyluk (1963–2022), American computer scientist
- Andrea Darvi, American actress
- Andrea Davidovich (born 1997), Israeli figure skater
- Andrea Davis Pinkney (born 1963), American writer
- Andrea Dawkins (born 1965), Australian City of Launceston Councillor
- Andrea de Andrade, Brazilian carnival queen
- Andrea de la Nava (born 1994), Spanish footballer
- Andrea de la Torre (born 1990), Spanish handball player
- Andrea Deck (born 1994), American actress
- Andrea Deelstra (born 1985), Dutch long-distance runner
- Andrea del Boca, (born 1965) Argentine actress
- Andréa del Fuego, Brazilian writer
- Andrea Del Rosario (born 1977), Filipino actress, beauty queen, model, and politician
- Andrea Delgado-Olson, Native American computer scientist
- Andrea Demetriades (born 1987), Australian actress
- Andrea Demirović (born 1985), Montenegrin singer
- Andrea Dennis (born 1982), British rower
- Andrea DeShong (born 1962), American boxer
- Andrea Destongue (born 1986), Venezuelan model
- Andrea Dettling (born 1987), Swiss alpine skier
- Andrea Detwiler, accomplishes costume designer
- Andrea Dewar (born 1979), Canadian water polo player
- Andrea Domburg (1923–1997), Dutch actress
- Andrea Donaldson, Canada theatre director
- Andrea Donnellan, American scientist
- Andrea Dorfman (born 1968), Canadian film director
- Andrea Doucet, Canadian social scientist and writer
- Andrea Drahota (born 1941), Hungarian actress
- Andrea Drews (born 1993), American volleyball player
- Andrea Dromm (born 1941), American actress
- Andrea Drummer, Cannabis chef
- Andrea Dunbar (1961–1990), English playwright
- Andrea Duran (born 1984), American baseball player
- Andrea Duro (born 1991), Spanish actress
- Andrea Dvorak (born 1980), American cyclist
- Andrea Dworkin (1946–2005), American radical feminist and writer
- Andrea Echeverri (born 1965), Colombian singer and guitarist, lead singer of the rock band Aterciopelados
- Andrea Eckert (born 1958), Austrian actress, singer and filmmaker
- Andrea Eder-Gitschthaler (born 1961), Austrian politician
- Andrea Een (born 1947), American musician
- Andrea Egan, British trade unionist
- Andrea Ehrig-Mitscherlich (born 1960), German speed skater
- Andreea Ehritt-Vanc (born 1973), Romanian tennis player
- Andrea Eife (born 1956), German swimmer
- Andrea Elle (born 1940), German racing cyclist
- Andrea Ellenberger (born 1993), Swiss World Cup alpine ski racer
- Andrea Elliott (born 1972), American journalist
- Andrea Elson (born 1969), American former actress
- Andreea Esca, Romanian television journalist, main anchor of Știrile PRO TV
- Andrea Escobar (born 1993), Colombian actress, television hostess and model
- Andrea Eskau (born 1971), German sportswoman
- Andrea Esteban (born 1996), Spanish footballer
- Andrea Evans (1957–2023), American actress
- Andrea Fabra (born 1973), Spanish politician
- Andrea Faciu (born 1977), Romanian artist
- Andrea Falcón (born 1997), Spanish footballer
- Andrea Farkas (born 1969), Hungarian handball goalkeeper
- Andrea Farley (born 1971), American tennis player
- Andrea Fatona, Canadian art curator and scholar
- Andrea Faulkner, Australian diplomat
- Andrea Feczko (born 1985), American television presenter
- Andrea Feldman (historian) (born 1960), Croatian historian and liberal politician
- Andrea Feldman (1948–1972), American actress
- Andrea Fellers, American film director
- Andrea Fendt (born 1960), German luger
- Andrea Fenzau-Lehmann, German aviator
- Andréa Ferréol (born 1947), French actress
- Andrea Filser (born 1993), German alpine skier
- Andrea Fioroni (born 1969), Argentine field hockey player
- Andrea Fischbacher (born 1985), Austrian alpine skier
- Andrea Fischer (born 1960), German politician
- Andrea Foglia (born 1985), Uruguayan sports sailor
- Andrea Fonseka (born 1984), Filipino-Malaysian model and beauty pageant
- Andrea Foster (born 1997), Guyanese middle-distance runner
- Andrea Foulkes, British past life regression therapist
- Andrea Fraile (born 1993), Spanish cyclist
- Andrea Fraser (born 1965), American performance artist
- Andrea Fraunschiel (1955–2019), Austrian politician
- Andrea Fay Friedman (1970–2023), American film and television actress
- Andrea Friedman (historian), American historian and professor
- Andrea Frome, American computer scientist
- Andrea Fuentes (born 1983), Spanish synchronized swimmer
- Andrea Gacki, American attorney
- Andrea Galante (born 1982), Argentine actress
- Andrea Galer, British costume designer
- Andrea Galgó Ferenci (1973–2024), Serbian politician
- Andrea Gamarnik (born 1964), Argentine molecular virologist
- Andrea Gámiz (born 1992), Venezuelan tennis player
- Andrea Garae (born 1973), Vanuatuan middle-distance runner
- Andrea Gardiner (born 1981), American figure skater
- Andrea Gardner (born 1979), American basketball player
- Andrea Garner (born 1979), American basketball player
- Andrea Gavrić (born 2001), Bosnia and Herzegovina footballer
- Andrea Geissbühler (born 1976), Swiss politician
- Andrea Gerzsényi (born 1991), Hungarian handball player
- Andrea Gesch (born 1973), German rower
- Andrea Geubelle (born 1991), American track and field athlete
- Andrea M. Ghez (born 1965), American astronomer
- Andrea Ghidone (born 1978), Uruguayan vedette, fashion model, professional dancer and actress
- Andrea Gibb, Scottish screenwriter and actress
- Andrea Gibson (1975–2025), American poet and activist
- Andrea Giles Rich, American television soap opera director
- Andrea Gilmore (born 1988), Australian netball player and Australian rules footballer
- Andrea Giordano (born 1976), Argentine gymnast
- Andrea Glass (born 1976), German tennis player
- Andrea Glibo (born 2002), Croatian footballer
- Andrea Gmür-Schönenberger (born 1964), Swiss politician
- Andrea Gómez (model) (born 1985), Venezuelan model
- Andrea Gómez (artist) (1926–2012), Mexican artist
- Andrea Gonsebate (born 1977), Argentine footballer
- Andrea Gore, scientist
- Andrea Gorski (born 1970), American basketball coach
- Andrea L. Graham, American parasitologist and researcher
- Andrea Gram (1853–1927), Norwegian artist
- Andrea Graus (born 1979), Austrian cyclist
- Andrea Greene, Chilean field hockey player
- Andrea Grill (born 1975), Austrian biologist
- Andrea Grimes Parker, American computer scientist and academic
- Andrea Grobocopatel (born 1964), Argentine economist
- Andrea Gropman, American pediatric neurologist
- Andrea Grottoli, Canadian biologist
- Andrea Grover (born 1970), American curator, artist and writer
- Andrea Gruber, American dramatic soprano
- Andréa Guiot (1928–2021), French operatic soprano
- Andrea Gurtner (born 2001), Austrian footballer
- Andrea Gyarmati (born 1954), Hungarian swimmer
- Andrea Haberlaß (born 1964), German footballer
- Andrea Hah (born c. 1985), Australian rock climber
- Andrea Hahmann (born 1966), German middle-distance runner
- Andrea Hairston, African—American science fiction, fantasy playwright and novelist
- Andrea Hall (born 1947), American soap opera actress
- Andrea Hamilton, Peruvian artist
- Andrea Hams (born 1982), New Zealand weightlifter and hurdler
- Andrea Hanak, German painter
- Andrea Hannos (born 1973), Canadian cyclist
- Andrea Harrison (born 1963), American politician
- Andrea Harsági (born 1971), Hungarian badminton player
- Andrea Hatle (born 1965), German luger
- Andrea Haugen (1969–2021), German singer
- Andrea Rán Snæfeld Hauksdóttir (born 1996), Icelandic footballer
- Andrea Hayes (born 1969), American backstroke swimmer
- Andrea Hayes-Jordan, American pediatric surgeon
- Andrea Hays, American actress
- Andrea Hazell, Canadian politician
- Andrea Hedegaard, Danish women's rights activist
- Andrea Hegen (born 1985), German Paralympic athlete
- Andrea Heim (born 1961), East German volleyball player
- Andrea Joyce Heimer (born 1981), American painter
- Andrea Heinemann Simon (1909–1994), American civil rights activist and the mother of singer Carly Simon
- Andrea Heinrich (born 1972), German footballer
- Andrea Helms (born 1973), American musical artist
- Andrea Henkel (born 1977), German biathlete
- Andréa Henriques (born 1980), Brazilian water polo player
- Andrea Herczeg (born 1994), Romanian footballer
- Andrea L. Hertzfeld (born 1979), American judge
- Andrea Herzog (born 1999), German canoeist
- Andrea Hewitt (born 1982), New Zealand triathlete
- Andrea Higgins, American painter
- Andrea Hinding, American archivist
- Andrea Hirata (born 1967), Indonesian author
- Andrea Hlaváčková (born 1986), Czech tennis player
- Andrea Hodge, Colombian-born materials scientist
- Andrea C. Hoffer, German painter
- Andrea Holíková (born 1968), Czechoslovak tennis player
- Andrea Holland (born 1958), British synchronized swimmer and coach
- Andrea Hollander Budy (born 1947), American poet
- Andrea Holmes (born 1982), Canadian Paralympic alpine skier
- Andrea Holt (born 1970), British table tennis player
- Andrea Hoover (born 1992), American basketball player
- Andrea Horváthová (born 1995), Slovak footballer
- Andrea Horwath (born 1962), mayor of Hamilton and Canadian politician
- Andrea Howard (born 1947), American actress
- Andrea Huber (born 1975), Swiss cross-country skier
- Andrea Hübner (born 1957), East German swimmer
- Andrea Huisgen (born 1990), German-Spanish model and former Miss Spain
- Andrea Hull (born 1949), Australian academic
- Andrea Hunley, American politician
- Andrea van den Hurk (born 1979), Dutch tennis player
- Andrea Huser (1973–2020), Swiss mountain biker
- Andrea Ihle (born 1953), German opera singer
- Andrea Ivančević (born 1984), Croatian hurdler
- Andrea Ivanova (born 2009), Bulgarian rhythmic gymnast
- Andrea Ivory, women's health advocate
- Andrea Jaeger (born 1965), American former tennis player
- Andrea Jaffe (1950–2016), prominent Hollywood publicist in the late 20th-century
- Andrea Jakab (born 1981), Romanian speed skater
- Andrea James (playwright), Australian playwright
- Andrea James (born 1967), American writer, film producer, director and activist
- Andrea Janakas, American film director
- Andrea Janjušević (born 2003), Montenegrin footballer
- Andrea H. Japp (born 1957), French scientist and author
- Andrea Jardi (born 1990), Spanish alpine skier
- Andrea Jeftanovic (born 1970), Chilean author, sociologist and academic
- Andrea Jenkins (born 1961), American writer and politician
- Andrea Jenkyns (born 1974), British politician
- Andrea Jenna, Canadian television host, actress and spokesperson
- Andrea Jeremiah (born 1985), Indian Tamil playback singer, film actress and model.
- Andrea Jin, Canadian comedian
- Andrea Jirků (born 1989), Czech long track speed skater
- Andrea John, Austrian dressage rider
- Andrea Jones, Scottish garden photographer
- Andrea Jourdan, Canadian chef, ghostwriter and culinary author
- Andrea Joyce (born 1954), American sportscaster
- Andrea Jung (born 1958), business executive
- Andrea Jurčić (born 1972), Croatian badminton and volleyball player
- Andrea Jürgens (1967–2017), German singer
- Andrea Ka (born 1992), Cambodian tennis player
- Andrea Kaiser (born 1982), German television presenter
- Andrea Kalavská (born 1977), Slovak physician
- Andrea Kalin, American filmmaker
- Andrea Kalivodová (born 1977), Czech opera singer
- Andrea Kalousová (born 1996), Czech model and beauty pageant titleholder
- Andrea von Kampen, American singer songwriter
- Andrea Kane, American novelist
- Andrea Katz, American politician and lawyer
- Andrea Kaufmann (born 1969), Austrian politician
- Andrea Kékesy (1926–2024), Hungarian figure skater
- Andrea Keller (born 1973), Australian pianist and composer
- Andrea Kéri (born 1984), Hungarian hammer thrower
- Andrea Kertészová (born 1988), Slovak handball player
- Andrea Keszler (born 1989), Hungarian speed skater
- Andrea Kevichüsa (born 2001), Indian model and actress
- Andrea Khanjin (born 1987), member of Provincial Parliament of Barrie-Innisfil
- Andrea Kieffer (born 1964), American politician
- Andrea Kiewel (born 1965), German television presenter
- Andrea Kilbourne-Hill (born 1980), American ice hockey player
- Andrea Kilday (born 1982), New Zealand taekwondo practitioner)
- Andrea King (1919–2003), American actress
- Andrea Kinsale (born 1989), Trinidad and Tobago volleyball player
- Andrea Kiss (born 1995), Hungarian ice hockey player
- Andrea Kitahata (born 2003), American soccer player
- Andrea Klambauer (born 1977), Austrian politician
- Andrea Kleine (born 1970), American novelist
- Andrea Klikovac (born 1991), Montenegrin handball player
- Andrea Kneppers (born 1993), Dutch swimmer
- Andrea Kobetić (born 1985), Croatian handball player
- Andrea Koch Benvenuto (born 1985), Chilean tennis player
- Andrea Koevska (born 2000), Macedonian singer and 2022 Eurovision Song Contest entrant
- Andrea Kolbeinsdóttir (born 1999), Icelandic runner
- Andrea Komšić (born 1996), Croatian alpine skier
- Andrea Koppel (born 1963), American news correspondent
- Andrea Kowch, American painter
- Andrea Kozma (born 1962), Austrian field hockey player
- Andrea Krætzmer (1811–1889), Danish ballet dancer
- Andrea Kremer (born 1959), American sports journalist
- Andrea Kreuzer (born 1984), Austrian figure skater
- Andrea Kritcher, American nuclear engineer and physicist
- Andrea Kropp (born 1993), American swimmer
- Andrea Kruis (born 1962), Dutch comics artist
- Andrea Kuklová (born 1971), Slovak basketball player
- Andrea Kuntzl (born 1958), Austrian politician
- Andrea Kurth (born 1957), East German rower
- Andrea Ladányi (born 1969), Hungarian gymnast
- Andrea LaFontaine (born 1987), American politician
- Andrea Lagunés (born 1992), Mexican actress and singer
- Andrea Justine Landi (born 1988), American volleyball player
- Andrea Lanzl (born 1987), German ice hockey player
- Andrea LaPaugh, American computer scientist
- Andrea Lawes (born 1962), Canadian curler and coach
- Andrea Lawlor, 21st-century American novelist
- Andrea Lázaro García (born 1994), Spanish tennis player
- Andrea Lea, American politician and auditor
- Andrea Leadsom (born 1963), British politician
- Andrea Leand (born 1964), American tennis player
- Andrea Leeds (1914–1984), American actress
- Andrea Leers, American architect and educator
- Andrea Legarreta (born 1972), Mexican actress and television host
- Andrea Lehmann, German artist
- Andrea Lehotská (born 1981), Slovak television hostess, actress, and top model.
- Andrea Lekić (born 1987), Serbian handball player
- Andrea Letanovská (born 1969), Slovak politician and physician
- Andrea Levin, CAMERA director
- Andrea Levy (politician) (born 1984), Spanish politician
- Andrea Levy (1956–2019), British author
- Andrea Lewis (born 1985), Canadian actress
- Andrea Libman (born 1984), Canadian Voice Actress
- Andrea Lieberman, American fashion designer
- Andrea Lignell (born 2000), Swedish professional golfer
- Andrea Limbacher (born 1989), Austrian freestyle skier
- Andrea Limper (born 1966), German footballer
- Andrea Lindholz (born 1970), German politician
- Andrea Lindsay, Canadian pop singer-songwriter
- Andrea Liu (born 1962), American professor of physics
- Andrea Londo (born 1992), American actress
- Andrea Long Chu (born 1992), American writer
- Andrea López Caballero, Spanish painter
- Andrea López (born 1977), Colombian actress
- Andrea López (footballer) (born 1995), Nicaraguan footballer
- Andrea Lowe (born 1975), British actress
- Andrea Lowell (born 1983), American actress and model
- Andrea Lübcke (born 1978), German politician
- Andrea R. Lucas, American lawyer
- Andrea Ludwig (born 1970), Canadian opera singer
- Andrea Luka Zimmerman (born 1969), British filmmaker and activist
- Andrea Lundgren, Swedish writer
- Andrea Lunsford, American writer and scholar
- Andrea Lykke Oehlenschlæger (born 1997), Danish singer and musical theatre actress
- Andrea Lynch (born 1952), British sprinter
- Andrea Macasaet (born 1994), Canadian actress and singer
- Andrea MacPherson, Canadian poet and novelist
- Andréa Maechler, Swiss economist
- Andrea Mager (born 1966), Hungarian politician
- Andrea Mágori (born 1952), Hungarian politician
- Andréa Maltarolli (1962–2009), Brazilian screenwriter
- Andrea Mann, Canadian actor and director
- Andrea Marcolongo (born 1987), Italian essayist and writer
- Andrea Marcovicci (born 1948), American actress and singer
- Andrea Marić (born 1997), Croatian basketball player
- Andrea Marra (born 1985), American politician
- Andrea Marshall, American marine biologist
- Andrea Martí (born 1987), Mexican actress
- Andrea Marzi, German American virologist
- Andrea Mátay (born 1955), Hungarian high jumper
- Andrea M. Matwyshyn, American law and engineering professor
- Andrea Mayer (born 1962), Austrian politician
- Andrea Mayr (born 1979), Austrian long-distance runner
- Andrea McArdle (born 1963), American singer and actress
- Andréa McBride, American entrepreneur
- Andrea McCall (born 1952), Australian politician
- Andrea McCauley (born 1965), Australian and State cricketer
- Andrea McDonnell (born 1960), Australian para table tennis player
- Andrea McEwan (born 1978), Australian actress and musician
- Andrea McLean (born 1969), Scottish journalist and television presenter
- Andrea McVeigh, New Zealand netball player and sports commentator
- Andrea Medina (born 2004), Spanish footballer
- Andrea Meikle (born 1963), New Zealand footballer
- Andrea Menard, Canadian actress
- Andréa Menezes, Brazilian tennis player
- Andrea Metcalf, Bendigo politician
- Andrea Meyer (born 1968), American novelist
- Andrea Meza (born 1994), Mexican beauty queen and Miss Universe 2020
- Andrea Michaels (born 1975), Australian politician
- Andrea Carla Michaels (born 1959), American crossword constructor
- Andrea Miklós (born 1999), Romanian sprinter
- Andrea Milroy (born 1984), Venezuelan pageant titleholder
- Andrea Mitchell (born 1946), American news correspondent
- Andrea Mitchell (politician) (1956–2020), Australian politician
- Andrea Mitrovic (born 1999), volleyball player for Canada women's national volleyball team
- Andrea Modica, American photographer
- Andrea Mohr (born 1963), German writer
- Andrea Molina (born 1970), Chilean actress, businesswoman and politician
- Andrea Moller, Brazilian-American canoeist and surfer
- Andrea Molnár-Bodó (1934–2022), Hungarian gymnast
- Andrea Molnár (born 1975), Hungarian gymnast
- Andrea Monrocle (born 1997), Basque actress, visual artist and painter
- Andrea Montesinos Cantú (born 2002), Mexican figure skater
- Andrea Moody (born 1978), Canadian swimmer
- Andrea Moor, Australian actress
- Andrea S. Moore (born 1944), American politician
- Andrea Moraes (born 1969), Brazilian volleyball player
- Andrea Morrell, American rugby union player
- Andrea Morris (born 1983), Canadian actress
- Andrea Motis (born 1995), Spanish jazz singer and trumpeter
- Andrea Murez (born 1992), Israeli-American Olympic swimmer for Israel
- Andrea Myrander (born 1985), Swedish singer
- Andrea Nagy (born 1971), Hungarian basketball player
- Andrea Nahles (born 1970), German politician
- Andrea R. Nahmod, American politician
- Andrea Nahrgang (born 1978), American biathlete
- Andrea Nann (born 1966), Canadian dancer
- Andrea Natale, American cardiologist and electrophysiologist
- Andrea Natalie, American cartoonist
- Andrea Navedo (born 1977), American actress
- Andrea Neil (born 1971), Canadian soccer player
- Andrea Neu (born 1990), American beauty pageant titleholder
- Andrea Neuenhofen, better known by her stage name AnNa R. (1969–2025), German singer
- Andrea Blaugrund Nevins, American screenwriter
- Andrea Newman (1938–2019), British author
- Andrea Niederheide (born 1957), German gymnast
- Andrea Nield (born 1951), Australian architect
- Andrea Nightingale, American philosopher
- Andrea Nix Fine, American documentary film director
- Andrea Nocetti (born 1978), Colombian actress and beauty pageant titleholder
- Andrea Nolan, Irish-born British veterinary surgeon and senior academic
- Andrea Norheim (born 1999), Norwegian association football player
- Andrea Norris, American information technology executive
- Andrea Noszály (born 1970), Hungarian tennis player
- Andrea Nott (born 1982), American synchronized swimmer
- Andrea Nugent (born 1968), Canadian swimmer
- Andrea Nuyt (born 1974), Dutch speed skater
- Andrea Nye (born 1939), American philosopher
- Andrea Ódor (born 1975), Hungarian badminton player
- Andrea Ojeda (born 1985), Argentine footballer
- Andrea Okene (born 2001), Spanish footballer
- Andrea Olaya (born 1994), Colombian freestyle wrestler
- Andrea Olmstead (born 1948), American musicologist and historian
- Andrea Olsen (born 1961), American politician
- Andrea Orlandi (born 1984), Spanish former footballer
- Andrea Ortega-Lee, Mexican comedian, writer and actor
- Andrea Osvárt (born 1979), Hungarian actress, producer and former fashion model
- Andrea Ottochian (born 1988), Croatian footballer
- Andrea Page (born 1956), Canadian hurdler
- Andrea Palm (born 1973), American health advisor
- Andrea Palma (1903–1987), Mexican actress
- Andrea Mist Pálsdóttir (born 1998), Icelandic footballer
- Andrea Paoli (born 1992), Lebanese taekwondo practitioner
- Andrea Parhamovich (1978–2007), American activist
- Andréa Parisy, French film actress
- Andrea Parker (born 1969), British electronic music producer
- Andrea Parker (born 1970), American actress
- Andrea Parkins, American composer and musician
- Andrea Parra (born 1967), Chilean nurse and politician
- Andrea Pauli, German developmental biologist and biochemist
- Andrea Pažoutová (born 1979), Czech judoka
- Andrea Austmo Pedersen (born 1994), Norwegian handball player
- Andrea Pellegrini (born 1975), Danish musical artist
- Andrea Peralta (born 1988), Colombian footballer
- Andrea Pereira (born 1993), Spanish footballer
- Andrea Pérez Peña (born 1990), Ecuadorian sports shooter
- Andrea Petkovic (born 1987), German tennis player
- Andrea Pető (born 1964), Hungarian historian
- Andrea Peyser, American columnist
- Andrea Philipp (born 1971), German sprinter
- Andrea Phillips (born 1974), American game designer
- Andrea Pietra (born 1968), Argentine actress
- Andrea Pino (born 1992), American women's rights activist
- Andrea Piribauer (born 1990), Austrian para-alpine skier
- Andrea Piros (born 1966), Swiss fencer
- Andrea Pitter, Jamaican-American fashion designer
- Andrea Pitzer (born 1968), American journalist
- Andrea Pochak, Argentine lawyer
- Andrea Podmaníková (born 1998), Slovak swimmer
- Andrea Politti, Argentine actress and television host
- Andrea Pollack (1961–2019), East German swimmer
- Andrea Porsch (born 1959), Austrian field hockey player
- Andrea Portes, American novelist
- Andrea J. Prasow, Canadian lawyer
- Andrea L. Press, American sociologist and media scholar
- Andrea Procter, Canadian anthropologist
- Andrea Prono (born 1984), Paraguayan swimmer
- Andrea Proske (born 1986), Canadian rower
- Andrea Purica (born 1995), Venezuelan sprinter
- Andrea Purner-Koschier (born 1972), Austrian cyclist
- Andrea Quinn (born 1964), English conductor
- Andrea Raaholt (born 1996), Norwegian tennis player
- Andrea Radonjić (born 1992), Montenegrin beauty pageant titleholder
- Andreea Răducan (born 1983), Romanian gymnast
- Andrea Rangel (born 1993), Mexican volleyball player
- Andrea Rau (born 1947), German actress
- Andrea Reeb, American attorney and politician
- Andrea Star Reese (born 1952), American photographer
- Andrea Reichstein (born 1959), German high jumper
- Andrea Reimann-Ciardelli, German-American heiress
- Andrea Reimer, Canadian politician
- Andrea Reinkemeyer (born 1976), American composer
- Andrea Rentmeister (born 1977), Austrian chemist and fencer
- Andrea Repetto (born 1969), Chilean economist
- Andrea Reusing, American chef
- Andrea Revuelta (born 2006), Spanish golfer
- Andrea Rica (born 1984), Spanish taekwondo practitioner
- Andréa W. Richa, Brazilian-American computer scientist
- Andrea Richardson, American pathologist and physician-scientist
- Andrea Riley (born 1988), American basketball player
- Andrea Riseborough (born 1981), English actress
- Andrea Ritchie, American activist and author
- Andrea Rivadeneira, Ecuadorian politician
- Andrea Rivette, American actress
- Andrea Roane (born 1949), American journalist
- Andrea Roche (born 1977), Irish model
- Andrea Rodebaugh (born 1966), Mexican footballer and manager
- Andrea Evangelina Rodríguez Perozo (1879–1947), Dominican poet and physician
- Andrea Rogers, New Zealand footballer
- Andrea Romero, American politician
- Andrea Rooth (born 2002), Norwegian athletics competitor
- Andrea Rosales (born 1991), Venezuelan model and beauty queen
- Andrea Rosen (born 1974), American actress
- Andrea Rost (born 1962), Hungarian lyric soprano
- Andrea Roth (born 1967), Canadian actress
- Andrea Rothfuss (born 1989), German para-alpine skier
- Andrea Rotnitzky, Argentine biostatistician
- Andrea Routley, Canadian writer
- Andrea Rubio (born 1998), Venezuelan model and beauty queen
- Andrea Elisabeth Rudolph (born 1976), Danish television and radio host
- Andrea Ruiz, Argentine politician
- Andrea Rushton (born 1979), Canadian field hockey player
- Andrea Rusnock, American historian
- Andrea Russell, American chemist
- Andrea Russett (born 1996), American actress
- Andrea Růžičková (born 1984), Slovak actress and model
- Andrea Rydin Berge (born 1984), Norwegian jazz musician, composer and band leader
- Andrea Salinas (born 1969), American politician
- Andrea Sanke, American television journalist and presenter
- Andrea Saul, American political consultant
- Andrea Sauvigny (born 1960), German volleyball player
- Andrea Savage (born 1973), American actress
- Andrea Sawatzki (born 1963), German actress
- Andrea Scacco (born 1986), Ecuadorian politician
- Andrea Schaller (born 1976), German footballer
- Andrea Michaela Schartel (born 1964), Austrian politician
- Andrea Maria Schenkel (born 1962), German writer
- Andrea Scherney (born 1966), Austrian Paralympic athlete
- Andrea Batista Schlesinger (born 1976), American political writer and campaigner
- Andrea Schöpp (born 1965), German curler and Olympic gold medalist
- Andrea Schreiner (born 1959), Canadian rower
- Andrea Schroeder (1964–2021), American politician
- Andrea Schwartz (born 1977), Canadian swimmer
- Andrea Scrima, American novelist, essayist and artist
- Andrea Seabrook (born 1974), American journalist
- Andrea Seastrand (born 1941), American politician
- Andrea Šebestová (born 1978), Czech rhythmic gymnast
- Andrea Šebová (born 1980), Slovak tennis player
- Andrea Seccafien (born 1990), Canadian long-distance runner
- Andrea Sedláčková (born 1967), Czech film director
- Andrea Seigel (born 1979), American novelist and screenwriter
- Andrea Senteler (born 1977), Swiss cross-country skier
- Andrea Šerić (born 1985), Croatian handball player
- Andrea Serna (born 1977), Colombian broadcaster
- Andrea Shaw (born 1983), American professional bodybuilder
- Andrea Sierra, Spanish footballer
- Andrea Silbert, American nonprofit executive
- Andrea Šimara (born 1997), Croatian handball player
- Andrea Sims, American linguist
- Andrea Sinclair (born 1993), Canadian curler
- Andrea Sinkó (born 1967), Hungarian rhythmic gymnast
- Andrea Siodmok, British industrial designer, social innovator, academic and international public speaker
- Andrea Sisson (born 1989), American artist
- Andrea Slobodian, Canadian television reporter
- Andrea Spendolini-Sirieix (born 2004), British diver
- Andrea Sperling (born 1968/1969), American film producer
- Andrea Spofford, American poet, essayist and professor
- Andrea Spyropoulos, British nurse and clinical strategist
- Andrea Stadnyk, Canadian lawn bowler
- Andrea Štaka (born 1973), Swiss film director
- Andrea Stark (born 1962), British art executive
- Andrea Stašková (born 2000), Czech footballer
- Andrea Dew Steele, American activist
- Andrea Stewart-Cousins (born 1950), American politician
- Andrea Stillman, American politician
- Andrea Stinson (born 1967), American basketball player
- Andrea Stock (born 1980), German curler
- Andrea Stojadinov (born 2000), Serbian judoka
- Andrea Stolletz (born 1963), German handball player
- Andrea Stolowitz, American playwright and professor
- Andrea Joyce Stone (1949–2014), North American Mayanist
- Andrea Stranovská (born 1970), Slovak sports shooter
- Andrea Strnadová (born 1972), Czech tennis player
- Andrea Stuart (born 1962), Barbadian-British historian and writer
- Andrea Šušnjara (born 1987), Croatian singer
- Andrea Sutcliffe, British chief executive
- Andrea Szalay (born 1976), Hungarian rhythmic gymnast
- Andrea Szilasi, Canadian photographer
- Andrea Tagwerker (born 1970), Austrian luger
- Andrea Talentino, American political scientist and academic administrator
- Andrea Tankeu (born 2007), Spanish athlete
- Andrea Tantaros (born 1978), American political analyst
- Andréa Sardinha Taschetto, climate change scientist
- Andrea Temesvári (born 1966), Hungarian tennis player
- Andrea Tessa (born 1961), Chilean actor
- Andrea Thome, Chilean and Costa Rican playwright
- Andrea L. Thompson (born 1966), American government official
- Andrea Thompson (born 1960), American actress
- Andrea Thorisson (born 1998), Peruvian footballer
- Andrea Thürig (born 1978), Swiss cyclist
- Andrea Tiezzi (born 1964), Argentine tennis player
- Andrea Tinnes, German type designer, graphic designer and university teacher
- Andrea Tobar (born 1988), Guatemalan footballer
- Andréa Tommasi, marine biologist
- Andrea Törnestam (born 1991), Swedish politician
- Andrea Torres (born 1990), Filipina actress and model
- Andrea Toscano (born 1998), Mexican model
- Andrea Tóth (born 1980), Hungarian water polo player
- Andrea Toušková (born 1992), Czech motorcycle racer
- Andrea Tovar (beauty pageant titleholder) (born 1993), Colombian beauty pageant titleholder
- Andrea Fernanda Tovar (born 1990), Venezuelan footballer
- Andrea Trnková (born 2004), Czech ice hockey player
- Andrea Troxel, American biostatistician
- Andrea True (1943–2011), porn actress and singer
- Andrea Tullos, U. S. Air Force general
- Andrea Turčanová (born 1966), Slovak politician
- Andrea U'Ren, American writer
- Andrea Urrutia (born 1997), Peruvian volleyball player
- Andrea Valderrama (born 1989), American politician
- Andrea Van de Kamp, Los Angeles businesswoman and philanthropist
- Andréa Vanderstukken (born 1991), French badminton player
- Andrea Vargas (born 1996), Costa Rican hurdler
- Andrea Varraux (born 1986), American pair skater
- Andrea Michelle Velasco Barrera (born 1997), Salvadoran pole vaulter
- Andrea Velasco (born 1981), Chilean actress and singer
- Andrea Velis (1932–1994), American operatic tenor
- Andrea Véliz (born 1993), Guatemalan footballer
- Andrea Veneracion (1928–2013), Filipino conductor
- Andrea Vera (born 1993), Ecuadorian footballer
- Andrea Verešová (born 1980), Slovak model and beauty pageant titleholder
- Andrea Verobish, American politician
- Andrea Vidaurre (born 1993/1994), American environmental justice advocate
- Andrea Vieira (born 1971), Brazilian tennis player
- Andrea Vilaró (born 1993), Spanish basketball player
- Andrea Villagrán, Guatemalan economist and politician
- Andrea Villarreal (1881–1963), Mexican feminist revolutionary
- Andrea Vissers (born 1952), Dutch rower
- Andrea Volkamer, German bioinformatician
- Andrea Voßhoff (born 1958), German lawyer and politician
- Andrea Vötter (born 1995), Italian luger
- Andrea Waldis (born 1994), Swiss cyclist
- Andrea Wallace (born 1966), British long-distance runner
- Andrea Walther, German mathematician
- Andrea Wang, Asian American children's author
- Andrea Weber, applied labor economist
- Andrea Wechsler (born 1977), German politician
- Andrea Weiermann-Lietz (born 1958), German field hockey player
- Andrea Weigand (born 1977), Canadian international lawn bowler
- Andrea Werhun, Canadian writer and actress
- Andrea Werner (born 1975), Brazilian journalist and politician
- Andrea West Bendtsen (born 1999), Danish handball player
- Andrea West (1952–2010), Australian politician
- Andrea Whitcombe (born 1971), British former runner and triathlete
- Andrea White (born 1953), American novelist and civic leader
- Andrea White (politician), American politician
- Andrea Wicklein (born 1958), German politician
- Andrea Nirmala Widjajanto (born 1999), Indonesian film director
- Andrea Wieland (born 1969), American field hockey player
- Andrea Joana-Maria Wiktorin (born 1957), German diplomat
- Andrea Wilkens (born 1984), German footballer
- Andrea Willi (born 1955), Liechtenstein politician and government minister
- Andrea Wilson (born 1985), Australian basketball player
- Andrea Wong, American businesswoman
- Andrea Wood (born 1973), American judge
- Andrea Woodner, American architect
- Andrea Worrall (born 1977), English-born Welsh footballer
- Andrea Wright, American professional basketball player
- Andrea Wulf, German-British historian and writer
- Andrea Yates (born 1964), American defendant in a notorious filicide case
- Andrea Young, American experimental physicist
- Andrea Ypsilanti (born 1957), German politician
- Andrea Zemanová (born 1993), Czech skier
- Andrea Zimmerer (born 1965), German para table tennis player
- Andréa Zimmermann (born 1976), Swiss ski mountaineer and mountain runner
- Andrea Zinga, American television journalist
- Andrea Zinsli (born 1972), Swiss alpine skier
- Andrea Zittel, American artist
- Andrea Zollo (born 1975), American singer
- Andrea Zonn (born 1969), American singer and musician
- Andrea Zryd (born 1975), Swiss politician
- Andrea Zsadon (born 1946), Hungarian soprano
- Andrea (born 1987), Bulgarian singer

=== Men ===
- Andrea Abodi (born 1960), Italian politician and business executive
- Andrea Accardi (born 1995), Italian footballer
- Andrea Accordi, Italian chef
- Andrea Matteo Acquaviva (1458–1529), Italian nobleman and condottiero
- Andrea de Adamich (1941–2025), Italian racing driver
- Andrea Addobbati (born 1964), Italian economic historian
- Andrea Adolfati, 18th century Italian composer
- Andrea Adorante (born 2000), Italian footballer
- Andrea Adorno, Italian Army officer
- Andrea Agathangelou (born 1989), South African cricketer
- Andrea Aghini (born 1963), Italian rally driver
- Andrea Agnelli (born 1975), Italian businessman
- Andrea Agostinelli (born 1957), Italian footballer and coach
- Andrea Agresti (born 1953), Italian politician
- Andrea Agrusti (born 1995), Italian race-walker
- Andrea Aguyar (died 1849), Uruguayan slave turned soldier and revolutionary
- Andrea Aiuti (1849–1905), Italian Catholic prelate
- Andrea Alberti (born 1985), Italian footballer
- Andrea Alciato (1492–1550), Italian jurist
- Andrea Aleksi (1425–1505), Albanian architect
- Andrea Alù (born 1978), Italian-American electrical engineer
- Andrea Amati (1505–1577), luthier from Cremona, Italy, credited with making the first instruments of the violin family that are in the form we use today
- Andrea Amici (born 1971), Italian sprinter
- Andrea Ammonio (c. 1478–1517), Italian poet
- Andrea Anastasi (born 1960), Italian volleyball player
- Andrea Andreani (1540–1623), Italian engraver on wood
- Andrea Angel (1877–1917), British chemist
- Andrea Angiolino (born 1966), Italian board game designer
- Andrea Antico (c. 1480 – c. 1538) was an Istrian music printer, editor, publisher and composer of the Renaissance
- Andrea Antonelli (1988–2013), Italian motorcycle racer
- Andrea Kimi Antonelli (born 2006), Italian racing driver
- Andrea Appiani (1754–1817), Italian painter
- Andrea Apuzzo, American chef
- Andrea Arcangeli (born 1993), Italian actor
- Andrea Ardito (born 1977), Italian footballer
- Andrea Argoli (1570–1657), Italian mathematician and astronomer
- Andrea Arlati (born 1970), Italian long-distance runner
- Andrea Armellini (born 1970), Italian footballer
- Andrea Arnaboldi (born 1987), Italian tennis player
- Andrea Aromatico (born 1966), Italian historian and expert in Hermetic iconography
- Andrea Arrighini (born 1990), Italian footballer
- Andrea Arru (born 2007), Italian actor and model
- Andrea Atzeni (born 1991), Italian-born jockey
- Andrea Augello (1961–2023), Italian politician
- Andrea Aureli (1923–2007), Italian actor
- Andrea Baccarelli, Italian-American epigeneticist and clinical endocrinologist
- Andrea Bacci (born 1972), Italian race car driver
- Andrea Bacigalupa (1923–2015), American artist and writer
- Andrea Badami (1913–2002), American painter and native artist
- Andrea Badan (born 1998), Italian football player
- Andrea Barnabà (born 2004), Italian high diver
- Andrea Biagio Badoer (1515–1575), Venetian politician
- Andrea Bagioli (born 1999), Italian cyclist
- Andrea Bagnai (born 1992), Italian footballer
- Andrea Bajani (born 1975), Italian novelist, poet and journalist
- Andrea Baldini (born 1985), Italian fencer
- Andrea Balestri (born 1963), Italian film actor
- Andrea Ballabio (born 1957), Italian scientist and academic professor
- Andrea Ballerin (born 1989), Italian alpine skier
- Andrea Ballerini (born 1973), Italian motorcycle racer
- Andrea Bandini (born 1994), Italian footballer
- Andrea Barbato (1934–1996), Italian journalist, writer and politician
- Andrea Barbazza, Italian Marinist poet and literary critic
- Andrea Barberi (1979–2023), Italian sprinter
- Andrea Barberis (born 1993), Italian footballer
- Andrea Barbiani (1708–1779), Italian painter
- Andrea Barchiesi, Italian electronic engineer and CEO of Reputation Manager company
- Andrea Bargnani (born 1985), Italian basketball player
- Andrea Bari (born 1980), Italian volleyball player
- Andrea Barlesi (born 1991), Belgian-Italian racing driver
- Andrea Bartolini (born 1968), Italian motorcycle racer
- Andrea Barzagli (born 1981), Italian football player
- Andrea Barzini (born 1952), Italian film director
- Andrea Baschirotto, Italian academic
- Andrea Basili (1705–1777), Italian composer and music theorist
- Andrea Basso (born 1993), Italian tennis player
- Andrea Bavena (born 1990), Italian footballer
- Andrea Beccari (born 1978), Italian swimmer
- Andrea Beduschi (born 1992), Italian footballer
- Andrea Beghetto (born 1994), Italian professional footballer
- Andrea Belfi, Italian composer
- Andrea Belicchi (born 1976), Italian professional racing driver
- Andrea Belli (1703–1772), Maltese architect
- Andrea Belloni, Italian Roman Catholic prelate
- Andrea Bellunello, Italian painter
- Andrea Belluzzi (born 1968), Sammarinese politician
- Andrea Belotti (born 1993), Italian footballer
- Andrea Beltratti (born 1959), Italian professor and economist
- Andrea Belvedere (c. 1652–1732), Italian painter
- Andrea Bempensante (born 1969), Italian screenwriter
- Andrea Benatti (born 1979), Italian rugby union player
- Andrea Benelli (born 1960), Italian sport shooter
- Andrea Benvenuti (born 1969), Italian middle-distance runner
- Andrea Bermond Des Ambrois (born 1964), Italian fencer
- Andrea Bernasconi (c. 1706–1784), 18th-century Italian composer
- Andrea Bernini (born 1973), Italian footballer
- Andrea Berta, Italian businessman
- Andrea Bertin (born 1992), Italian footballer
- Andrea Bertolacci (born 1991), Italian professional footballer
- Andrea Bertolini (born 1973), Italian professional racing driver
- Andrea Bertoni (c. 1454–1483), Italian Roman Catholic priest
- Andrea Bettinelli (born 1978), Italian high jumper
- Andrea Bezzola (1840–1897), Swiss jurist and politician
- Andrea Bianchi (1925–2013), Italian film director
- Andrea Bianchimano (born 1996), Italian footballer
- Andrea Bianco, Italian navigator and cartographer
- Andrea Boattini (born 1969), Italian astronomer
- Andrea Bocelli (born 1958), Italian singer, writer and music producer
- Andrea Boffelli (born 1997), Italian football player
- Andrea Bogdani (1600–1683), Albanian prelate and scholar
- Andrea Boldrini (born 1971), Italian racing driver
- Andrea Bolgi (1605–c. 1656), Italian sculptor
- Andrea Adami da Bolsena (1663–1742), Italian composer
- Andrea Bonaceto, Italian digital artist
- Andrea Bonacorsi (born 2003), Italian motocross racer
- Andrea Bonatta (born 1952), Italian pianist and conductor
- Andrea Bonatti (born 1984), Italian football manager
- Andrea Bondavalli (born 1960), Italian computer scientist
- Andrea Bondioli (born 1997), Italian footballer
- Andrea Bonetti (born 2003), Italian footballer
- Andrea Bonomi (1923–2003), Italian footballer
- Andrea Bonomi (philosopher), Italian philosopher and logician
- Andrea Boragno (born 1950), Italian business executive
- Andrea Borella (born 1961), Italian fencer
- Andrea Borg (born 1999), Maltese footballer
- Andrea Borgato (born 1972), Italian para table tennis player
- Andrea Borgnis (1930–1980), Italian weightlifter
- Andrea Borsa (born 1972), Italian footballer
- Andrea Bosca (born 1980), Italian actor
- Andrea Bosco (born 1995), Dominican footballer
- Andrea Boscoli (1560–1607), Italian painter
- Andrea Bosic (1919–2012), Italian actor
- Andrea Bovo (born 1986), Italian footballer
- Andrea Bracaletti (born 1983), Italian footballer
- Andrea Braides (born 1961), Italian mathematician
- Andrea Brancaccio (c. 1644–1725), Italian prelate
- Andrea Branzi (1938–2023), Italian architect and designer
- Andrea Bregno (c. 1418–1503), Italian sculptor
- Andrea Brenta, Italian Renaissance humanist, professor and Greek-Latin translator
- Andrea Bresciani (1923–2006), Italian-born comics artist, illustrator and animator
- Andrea Brighenti (born 1987), Italian footballer
- Andrea Briosco (c. 1470–1532), Italian sculptor and architect
- Andrea Briotti (born 1986), Italian footballer
- Andrea Brognara (born 1971), Italian cyclist
- Andrea Bronzini (born 1997), Italian rugby union player
- Andrea Bruniera (born 1964), Italian footballer
- Andrea Bruno (1931–2025), Italian architect
- Andrea Bruschi (born 1968), Italian actor
- Andrea Brustolon (1662–1732), Italian sculptor
- Andrea Buondonno (born 1992), Italian rugby union player
- Andrea Burato (born 1990), Italian professional footballer
- Andrea Busati, Italian painter
- Andrea Bussaglia (born 1997), Italian football player
- Andrea Caccese (born 1988), Italian musician
- Andrea Caccioli (1194–1254), Italian Roman Catholic priest
- Andrea Cagnano (born 1998), Italian footballer
- Andrea Caianiello (born 1987), Italian rower
- Andrea Calamech (1524–1589), Italian architect and sculptor
- Andrea Calcese, Italian comic actor
- Andrea Caldarelli (born 1990), Italian racing driver
- Andrea Califano, American biologist
- Andrea Camassei (1602–1649), Italian painter
- Andrea Cambiaso (born 2000), Italian footballer
- Andrea Cambini, Italian historian, humanist and writer
- Andrea Camilleri (1925–2019), Italian writer
- Andrea Campagnolo (born 1978), Italian football goalkeeper
- Andrea Camplone (born 1966), Italian football and manager
- Andrea Cangini (born 1969), Italian politician
- Andrea Cano (born 1976), Italian footballer and manager
- Andrea Canobbio, Italian writer and translator
- Andrea Cantelmo (1598–1645), Neapolitan commander
- Andrea Capobianco (born 1966), Italian basketball coach
- Andrea Capone (1981–2024), Italian footballer
- Andrea Capone (born 2002), Italian footballer
- Andrea Cappa (born 1993), Italian footballer
- Andrea Caputo, Italian Roman Catholic prelate
- Andrea Caracciolo (born 1981), Italian professional footballer
- Andrea Carboni (born 2001), Italian footballer
- Andrea Carè (born 1981), Italian opera tenor
- Andrea Carlone (1626–1697), Italian painter
- Andrea Carnevale (born 1961), Italian footballer
- Andrea Caroni (born 1980), Swiss politician
- Andrea Carpenzano (born 1995), Italian actor
- Andrea Carrea (1924–2013), Italian cyclist
- Andrea Carrera (1590–1677), Italian painter
- Andrea Casali (1705–1784), Italian painter
- Andrea Casarini (born 1994), Italian footballer
- Andrea Casiraghi (born 1984), eldest child of Princess Caroline of Monaco
- Andrea Cassarà (born 1984), Italian Olympic fencer
- Andrea Cassinelli (born 1993), Italian short track speed skater
- Andrea Casu (born 1981), Italian politician
- Andrea Catellani (born 1988), Italian footballer
- Andrea Cau, Italian paleontologist
- Andrea Causin (born 1972), Italian politician
- Andrea Cavallari, Italian composer and visual artist
- Andrea Cavalleri, Italian physicist
- Andrea Ceccarini (born 1964), Italian swimmer
- Andrea Ceccato (born 1985), Italian rugby union player
- Andrea Cecchi (born 1968), Italian swimmer
- Andrea Cecon (born 1970), Italian Nordic combined skier
- Andrea Celesti (1637–1712), Italian painter
- Andrea Celestini (1773–1830), Italian painter
- Andrea Censori (born 1988), Italian footballer
- Andrea Centazzo, Italian musician
- Andrea Cesalpino (1519–1603), Italian physician, philosopher and botanist
- Andrea Cesaro (born 1986), Italian footballer
- Andrea Checchi (1916–1974), Italian actor
- Andrea Chiarabini (born 1995), Italian diver
- Andrea Chiaramonte (died 1392), representative of the Sicilian nobility
- Andrea Chiarotti (1966–2018), Italian ice hockey player
- Andrea Chiesa (born 1964), Swiss racing driver
- Andrea Chiopris Gori (born 1977), Italian footballer
- Andrea Chiurato (born 1965), Italian cyclist
- Andrea Chukanov (born 1995), Italian-born Russian football player
- Andrea Cinciarini (born 1986), Italian basketball player
- Andrea Cingolani (born 1990), Italian artistic gymnast
- Andrea Ciofi (born 1999), Italian footballer
- Andrea Ciolli (born 1989), Italian footballer
- Andrea Cionna (born 1968), Italian Paralympic athlete
- Andrea Cipressa (born 1963), Italian fencer
- Andrea Cisco (born 1998), Italian footballer
- Andrea Cistana (born 1997), Italian association football player
- Andrea Cittadino (born 1994), Italian footballer
- Andrea Clemente (1942–1970), Italian bobsledder
- Andrea Cocco (born 1986), Italian footballer
- Andrea Coda (born 1985), Italian professional footballer
- Andrea Cola (born 1999), Italian racing driver
- Andrea Collarini (born 1992), Argentine-American tennis player
- Andrea Colli (born 1966), Italian academic
- Andrea Collinelli (born 1969), Italian cyclist
- Andrea Colombo (born 1974), Italian sprinter
- Andrea Colpani (born 1999), Italian footballer
- Andrea Cominelli, Italian sculptor
- Andrea Commodi (1560–1638), Italian painter
- Andrea Compagno (born 1996), Italian footballer
- Andrea Consigli (born 1987), Italian footballer
- Andrea Contadini (born 2002), Sammarinese footballer
- Andrea Coppolino (born 1979), Italian artistic gymnast
- Andrea Corbari (born 1994), Italian footballer
- Andrea Cordero Lanza di Montezemolo (1925–2017), Archbishop of Tuscania
- Andrea Corrado (1873–1963), Italian ship-owner
- Andrea Corsali (1487–?), Italian explorer
- Andrea Corsaro (born 1958), Italian politician
- Andrea Coscelli (born 1969), British economist and businessman
- Andrea Costa (1851–1913), Italian socialist activist
- Andrea Costa (footballer) (born 1986), Italian footballer
- Andrea Cottini (born 1976), Italian footballer
- Andrea Covi (born 1968), Italian sprint canoer
- Andrea Cozzolino (born 1962), Italian politician
- Andrea Crestadoro (1808–1879), Italian librarian and inventor
- Andrea Crippa (born 1986), Italian politician
- Andrea Crisanti (1936–2012), Italian production designer and art director
- Andrea Crisanti (scientist) (born 1954), Italian microbiologist and politician
- Andrea Cristiano (born 1984), Italian footballer
- Andrea Cristini (born 1994), Italian footballer
- Andrea Crosariol (born 1984), Italian basketball player
- Andrea Cupi (born 1976), Italian footballer
- Andrea Curiale, Italian Roman Catholic prelate
- Andrea da Barberino, Italian writer
- Andrea da Bologna, Italian painter
- Andrea da Grosseto, 13th-century Italian writer
- Andrea Dal Col (born 1991), Italian cyclist
- Andrea Dalla Costa, Italian painter
- Andrea Dallavalle (born 1999), Italian triple jumper
- Andrea Danzi (born 1999), Italian professional footballer
- Andrea De Cesaris (1959–2014), Italian racing driver
- Andrea De Falco (born 1986), Italian footballer
- Andrea de Franchis, 17th century Roman Catholic bishop
- Andrea de Litio, 15th century Italian painter
- Andrea De Monte, rabbi and Jewish convert to Christianity
- Andrea De Nicolao (born 1991), Italian professional basketball player
- Andrea De Paola (born 1990), Italian footballer
- Andrea De Paoli (born 1999), Italian professional footballer
- Andrea De Priamo (born 1971), Italian politician
- Andrea de Rossi (bishop) (1644–1696), Italian Roman Catholic prelate
- Andrea de Rossi (born 1972), Italian rugby union footballer and coach
- Andrea De Vito (born 1991), Italian professional footballer
- Andrea De Zordo, Italian engineer
- Andrea Debono (1821–1871), Maltese trader and explorer
- Andrea Degortes (born 1943), Italian jockey
- Andrea dei Conti (1235–1302), Italian Catholic theologian
- Andrea del Castagno (c. 1419–1457), Italian Renaissance painter
- Andrea Del Santo, Italian politician and admiral
- Andrea del Sarto (1486–1530), Italian painter
- Andrea del Verrocchio (c. 1435–1488), Florentine sculptor
- Andrea Delcarro (born 1993), Italian footballer
- Andrea Della Corte (1883–1968), Italian musicologist
- Andrea della Robbia (1435–1525), Italian sculptor
- Andrea dell'Asta, Italian painter
- Andrea della Valle (1463–1534), Italian Roman Catholic cardinal
- Andrea Delmastro Delle Vedove (born 1976), Italian politician
- Andrea Demarmels, Swiss scouting official
- Andrea Denver (born 1991), Italian fashion model
- Andrea Deodati (1629–1713), Italian Roman Catholic prelate
- Andrea Derjaj (born 1996), Albanian boxer
- Andrea De Filippi (born 2000), know professionally as Alfa, Italian singer-songwriter and rapper
- Andrea di Alessandro (died 1569), Italian sculptor
- Andrea di Aloigi (1480–1521), Italian painter
- Andrea di Bartolo, medieval Italian painter, stained glass designer and illuminator of the Sienese School
- Andrea Di Corrado (born 1988), Italian cyclist
- Andrea di Cosimo (1478–1548), Italian painter
- Andrea Di Giovanni, Italian musician
- Andrea Di Grazia (born 1996), Italian footballer
- Andrea di Leone, Italian painter
- Andrea Di Liberto (born 1997), Italian sprinter canoeist
- Andrea Di Luisa (born 1982), Italian boxer
- Andrea di Mariotto del Minga (1540–1596), Italian painter
- Andrea di Niccolò, Italian painter
- Andrea Di Paola, Italian astronomer
- Andrea Di Paolo (born 1978), Italian composer
- Andrea Di Renzo (born 1995), Italian cyclist
- Andrea di Robilant (born 1957), Italian journalist and writer
- Andrea Di Stefano (born 1972), Italian actor and film director
- Andrea Di Vito (born 1971), Italian comic book artist
- Andrea Diana (born 1975), Italian basketball player
- Andrea Dimitry, Greek American hero in the War in 1812
- Andrea Dini (born 1996), Italian footballer
- Andrea Diprè (born 1974), Italian media personality, lawyer, and art critic
- Andrea diSessa (born 1947), American academic and epistemologist
- Andrea Doria (1466–1560), Italian statesman, condottiero and admiral
- Andrea Dossena (born 1981), Italian football manager
- Andrea Dovizioso (born 1986), Italian motorcycle racer
- Andrea Dupé (born 2008), French racing driver
- Andrea Mabor Dut Biar (born 2001), South Sudanese basketball player
- Andrea Ekonomi (1879–1934), Albanian teacher
- Andrea Emanuele Brasi (born 1996), know professionally as Bresh, Italian singer-songwriter and rapper
- Andrea Enria (born 1961), Italian economist
- Andrea Ercolanelli (born 2001), French para-cyclist
- Andrea Ercolani Volta (born 1995), Sammarinese hurdler
- Andrea Errico (born 1999), Italian footballer
- Andrea Esposito (born 1986), Italian footballer
- Andrea Fabbri (born 1992), Italian ice dancer
- Andrea Fabbrini (born 1974), Italian football striker
- Andrea Fabiano (born 1976), Italian company executive
- Andrea Facchin (born 1978), Italian canoeist
- Andrea Faccini (born 1966), Italian cyclist
- Andrea Falconieri (c. 1585–1656), Italian composer and lutenist
- Andrea Fantoni (1659–1734), Italian sculptor
- Andrea Farri, Italian composer
- Andrea Fattizzo (born 1975), Italian footballer
- Andrea Faustini (born 1994), Italian singer
- Andrea Febbraio, Italian entrepreneur, writer, professor and investor
- Andrea Federici (born 1997), Italian sprinter
- Andrea Fedi (born 1991), Italian cyclist
- Andrea Feola (born 1992), Italian footballer
- Andrea Ferrante (born 1968), Italian composer
- Andrea Ferrara, 16th-century Scottish artificer who introduced the manufacture of high-quality steel blades bearing his name
- Andrea Ferraris (born 2003), Italian footballer
- Andrea Ferreri (1673–1744), Italian sculptor
- Andrea Ferrero (1903–1996), Italian ambassador
- Andrea Ferrigato (born 1969), Italian cyclist
- Andrea Ferris (born 1987), Panamanian middle-distance runner
- Andrea Ferro (born 1973), Italian singer
- Andrea Ferrucci (1465–1526), Italian sculptor
- Andrea Figallo (born 1972), Italian composer and conductor
- Andréa Fileccia (born 1991), Belgian footballer
- Andrea Filipi (born 2003), Albanian footballer
- Andrea Finocchiaro Aprile (1878–1964), Italian politician
- Andrea Fondelli (born 1994), Italian water polo player
- Andrea Fortunato (1971–1995), Italian footballer
- Andrea Franchi, Italian Roman Catholic
- Andrea Francolisio d'Aquino, 17th-century Italian Roman Catholic bishop
- Andrea Frediani, Italian historian and novelist
- Andrea Fulignati (born 1994), Italian footballer
- Andrea Fulvio, Italian Renaissance humanist, poet and antiquarian
- Andrea Furegato (born 1997), Italian politician
- Andrea Gabrieli (c. 1532/33-1585), Italian composer
- Andrea Gadaldi (1907–1993), Italian footballer and coach
- Andrea Galasso (1932–2022), Italian politician
- Andrea Gallandi (1709–1779), Italian theologian
- Andrea Gallerani, Italian Roman Catholic
- Andrea Galliani (born 1988), Italian volleyball player
- Andrea Gallo (1928–2013), Italian presbyter
- Andrea Garbin (born 1976), Italian poet
- Andrea Gardini (born 1965), Italian volleyball player and coach
- Andrea Gargano (1883–1970), Italian wrestler
- Andrea Garosio (born 1993), Italian cyclist
- Andrea Gasbarro (born 1995), Italian footballer
- Andrea Gasbarroni (born 1981), Italian footballer
- Andrea Gasparo Corso, 16th-century Corsican trader and secret agent
- Andrea Gasparri (born 1989), Italian footballer
- Andrea Gastaldi (1826–1889), Italian painter
- Andrea Gaudenzi (born 1973), Italian tennis player
- Andrea Gaveglia (born 1984), Italian footballer
- Andrea Gemignani (born 1996), Italian footballer
- Andrea Gemma (1931–2019), Italian Roman Catholic bishop
- Andrea Gentile (born 1980), Italian footballer
- Andrea Gervasoni (born 1975), Italian football referee
- Andrea Gessa (born 1980), Italian footballer
- Andrea Ghezzi (born 2001), Italian footballer
- Andrea Ghion (born 2000), Italian footballer
- Andrea Ghiurghi (born 1966), Italian beach volleyball player
- Andrea Giacobazzi, Italian Roman Catholic prelate
- Andrea Giacomini (born 1987), Italian footballer
- Andrea Giaconi (born 1974), Italian hurdler
- Andrea Giallombardo (born 1980), Italian footballer
- Andrea Giani (born 1970), Italian volleyball player and coach
- Andrea Giannini (born 1976), Italian pole vaulter
- Andrea Giganti (1731–1787), Italian architect
- Andrea Gioannetti (1722–1800), Italian Roman Catholic bishop and cardinal
- Andrea Giocondi (born 1969), Italian middle-distance runner
- Andrea Giordana (born 1946), Italian actor
- Andrea Giorgis (born 1965), Italian politician
- Andrea Giovannini (born 1993), Italian speed skater
- Andrea Giovi (born 1983), Italian volleyball player
- Andrea Gnassi (born 1969), Italian politician
- Andrea Grandoni (born 1997), Sammarinese footballer
- Andrea Grendene (born 1986), Italian cyclist
- Andrea Grieco (born 1991), Italian footballer
- Andrea Gritti (1455–1538), Dove of Venice
- Andrea Guardini (born 1989), Italian racing cyclist
- Andrea Guarneri (1626–1698), Italian luthier
- Andrea Guatelli (born 1984), Italian footballer
- Andrea Gulli (born 1997), Italian footballer
- Andrea Habay, French actor
- Andrea Hristov (born 1999), Bulgarian footballer
- Andrea Iannone (born 1989), Italian MotoGP driver
- Andrea Icardi (born 1963), Italian footballer and manager
- Andrea Iervolino (born 1987), Italian film producer
- Andrea Illy (born 1964), Italian businessman
- Andrea Ingegneri (born 1992), Italian footballer
- Andrea Isufaj (born 1999), Italian footballer
- Andrea Ivan (born 1973), Italian footballer
- Andrea Jory (born 1957), Italian bobsledder
- Andrea Kim Taegŏn (1821–1846), first Korean Catholic priest, Patron Saint of Korea for the Catholic Church
- Andrea Kimi Antonelli (born 2006), Italian racing driver
- Andréa Kotarac (born 1989), French politician
- Andrea Kushi, Albanian painter
- Andrea La Mantia (born 1991), Italian footballer
- Andrea La Torre (born 1997), Italian basketball player
- Andrea Lalli (born 1987), Italian long-distance runner
- Andrea Landini (1847–c. 1912), Italian painter
- Andrea Lanzani (1641–1712), Italian painter
- Andrea Lanzano (1651–1709), Italian painter
- Andrea Larini (born 1968), Italian auto racing driver
- Andrea Laszlo De Simone (born 1986), Italian musician
- Andrea Lembo, Italian Roman Catholic Bishop
- Andrea Lenzi (born 1988), Italian rower
- Andrea Liberovici (born 1962), Italian composer
- Andréa Librici (born 2004), Belgian footballer
- Andrea Lilio, Italian painter
- Andrea Lisuzzo (born 1981), Italian footballer
- Andrea Liverani (born 1990), Italian Paralympic shooter
- Andrea Lo Cicero (born 1976), Italian rugby union player
- Andrea Loberto (born 1974), Italian football manager
- Andrea Locatelli (motorcyclist) (born 1996), Italian motorcycle racer
- Andrea Locatelli (1695–1741), Italian painter
- Andrea Lodovichetti (born 1976), Italian film director and screenwriter
- Andrea Lombardo (born 1987), Italian-Canadian soccer player
- Andrea Loredan, Venetian nobleman
- Andrea Losco (born 1951), Italian politician
- Andrea Lovotti (born 1989), Italian rugby union player
- Andrea Carlo Lucchesi (1859–1925), Anglo-Italian sculptor
- Andrea Lucchetta (born 1962), Italian volleyball player
- Andrea Luchesi (1741–1801), Italian composer
- Andrea Luci (born 1985), Italian footballer
- Andrea Lussardi (born 1992), Italian footballer
- Andrea Lutzu (born 1962), Italian politician
- Andrea Maccoppi (born 1987), Italian footballer
- Andrea Maestrelli (born 1998), Italian footballer
- Andrea Maffei (architect) (born 1968), Italian architect
- Andrea Maffei (1798–1885), Italian poet, translator and librettist
- Andrea Magi (born 1966), Italian boxer
- Andrea Magrassi (born 1993), Italian footballer
- Andrea Magrini (born 1997), Italian footballer
- Andrea Maida (born 1964), Italian speedway rider
- Andrea Mainardi, Italian painter
- Andrea Malatesta (1373–1416), Italian noble
- Andrea Malchiodi (born 1972), Italian mathematician
- Andrea Malinconico (c. 1624–1698), Italian painter
- Andrea Manciaracina, member of the Sicilian Mafia
- Andrea Mancini (born 1992), Italian footballer
- Andrea Mancini (born 1996), Italian footballer
- Andrea Mandorlini (born 1960), Italian footballer
- Andrea Mandorlini (born 1991), Italian footballer
- Andrea Manesi, Albanian leader
- Andrea Manfredi (1992–2018), Italian cyclist
- Andrea Mangelli (died 1655), Italian papal diplomat
- Andrea Mangiante (born 1976), Italian water polo player
- Andrea Manici (born 1990), Italian rugby union player
- Andrea Mannai (born 1963), Italian boxer
- Andrea Mantegna (c. 1431–1506), Florentine painter
- Andrea Mantovani (born 1984), Italian footballer
- Andrea Manzo (born 1961), Italian footballer and manager
- Andrea Marcato (born 1983), Italian rugby union footballer and coach
- Andrea Marconi (born 1985), Italian footballer
- Andrea Marcucci (footballer) (born 1999), Italian footballer
- Andrea Marcucci (born 1965), Italian politician and entrepreneur
- Andrea Marinelli (born 1982), Italian politician
- Andrea Pasqualino Marini, Italian painter
- Andrea Marko (born 1956), Albanian footballer and manager
- Andrea Marrazzi (1887–1972), Italian fencer
- Andrea Martella (born 1968), Italian politician
- Andrea Masciarelli (born 1982), Italian cyclist
- Andrea Masetti (born 1998), Italian footballer
- Andrea Masi (born 1981), Italian rugby union player
- Andrea Masiello (born 1986), Italian footballer
- Andrea Massena (1758–1817), French military commander
- Andrea Massucchi (1974–1997), Italian artistic gymnast
- Andrea Mastino (born 1999), Italian footballer
- Andrea Mastrillo, Italian Roman Catholic prelate
- Andrea Mastroni, Italian opera singer
- Andrea Matteucci (born 1962), Italian convicted serial killer
- Andrea Mazzantini (born 1968), Italian footballer
- Andrea Mazzarani (born 1989), Italian footballer
- Andrea Bruno Mazzocato (born 1948), Italian Roman Catholic prelate
- Andrea Mazzuoli (born 1992), Italian footballer
- Andréa Mbuyi-Mutombo (born 1990), Congolese footballer
- Andrea Mei (born 1989), Italian footballer
- Andrea Memmo (1729–1793), Venetian politician
- Andrea Meneghin (bobsleigh) (born 1958), Italian bobsledder
- Andrea Meneghin (born 1974), Italian basketball player and coach
- Andrea Menegon (born 1988), Italian footballer
- Andrea Mengoni (born 1983), Italian footballer
- Andrea Menniti Ippolito (born 1992), Italian rugby union player
- Andrea Merenda (born 1977), Italian footballer
- Andrea Merola, Italian canoeist
- Andrea Meroni (born 1997), Italian footballer
- Andrea Micheletti (born 1991), Italian rower
- Andrea Miglionico (1662–c. 1711), Italian painter
- Andrea Migliorini (born 1988), Italian footballer
- Andrea Migno (born 1996), Italian motorcycle racer
- Andrea Millet, Italian luger
- Andrea Mingardi (born 1940), Italian singer-songwriter and writer
- Andrea Minguzzi (born 1982), Italian Greco-Roman wrestler
- Andrea Minucci, Roman Catholic prelate
- Andrea Mira (born 1995), Italian footballer
- Andrea Molaioli (born 1967), Italian film director and screenwriter
- Andrea Molesini (born 1954), Italian novelist
- Andrea Moletta (born 1979), Italian cyclist
- Andrea Molinelli (born 1993), Italian footballer
- Andrea Molino (born 1964), Italian composer and conductor
- Andrea Montanari (born 1965), Italian sprinter
- Andrea Montanino, Italian economist
- Andrea Montermini (born 1964), Italian racing driver
- Andrea Monticelli (1640–1716), Italian painter
- Andrea Morassi (born 1988), Italian ski jumper
- Andrea Morello (born 1972), Italian professor of quantum computing
- Andrea Moretti (footballer) (born 2002), Italian footballer
- Andrea Moretti (born 1972), Italian rugby coach and former player
- Andrea Moro (born 1962), Italian linguist
- Andrea Moroni (born 1985), Sammarinese footballer
- Andrea Morricone (born 1964), Italian composer
- Andrea Mozzali (1895–1977), Italian painter
- Andrea Mugione (1940–2020), Italian Catholic bishop
- Andrea Mura (born 1964), Italian politician
- Andrea Muraro (born 1971), Italian rugby union player
- Andrea Musacchio (born 1964), Italian biologist
- Andrea Musacco (born 1982), Italian footballer
- Andrea Muzii (born 1999), Italian memory competitor
- Andrea Naccari (1841–1919), Italian physicist and mathematician
- Andrea Nalini (born 1990), Italian footballer
- Andrea Nannini (1944–2021), Italian volleyball player
- Andrea Natali (born 2008), Italian footballer
- Andrea Navagero (1483–1529), Italian diplomat and writer
- Andrea Navarra (born 1971), Italian rally driver
- Andrea Nencini (born 1948), Italian volleyball player
- Andrea Noè (born 1969), Italian cyclist
- Andrea Nozzari (1776–1832), Italian tenor
- Andrea Nuciforo (born 1964), US politician who served as Democratic State Senator (1997–2007)
- Andrea Nurcis (born 1962), Italian contemporary artist
- Andrea Nuti (born 1967), Italian sprinter
- Andrea Occhipinti (born 1957), Italian actor and film producer
- Andrea Offredi (born 1988), Italian footballer
- Andrea Olcese, Italian radio host and television show runner
- Andrea Oliveri (born 2003), Italian footballer
- Andrea Olivero (born 1970), Italian politician
- Andrea Orcagna (c. 1308–1368), Florentine painter, sculptor and architect
- Andrea Orcel (born 1963), Italian investment banker
- Andrea Oriana (born 1973), Italian swimmer
- Andrea Orlandini (born 1948), Italian footballer
- Andrea Orlando (born 1969), Italian politician
- Andrea Padula (born 1996), Swiss footballer
- Andrea Pagoto (born 1985), Italian cyclist
- Andrea Pais de Libera (born 1973), Italian bobsledder
- Andrea Palazzi (born 1996), Italian footballer
- Andrea Palini (born 1989), Italian cyclist
- Andrea Palladio (1508–1580), Italian architect
- Andrea Pallaoro (born 1982), Italian film director and screenwriter
- Andrea Matteo Palmieri (1493–c. 1537), Italian bishop and cardinal
- Andrea Palmisano (born 1988), Italian rower
- Andrea Paluan (born 1966), Italian cyclist
- Andrea Panizza (born 1998), Italian rower
- Andrea Pansera (born 1979), Italian footballer
- Andrea Paolelli (born 1997), Italian footballer
- Andrea Paolucci (born 1986), Italian footballer
- Andrea Papetti (born 2002), Italian footballer
- Andrea Parenti (born 1965), Italian archer
- Andrea Parodi (1955–2006), Italian singer
- Andrea Parodi (born 1975), Italian singer
- Andrea Parola (born 1979), Italian footballer
- Andrea Paroni (born 1989), Italian footballer
- Andrea Pasqualon (born 1988), Italian road cyclist
- Andrea Pastore (born 1994), Italian footballer
- Andrea Patassa, Italian test pilot and reserve astronaut
- Andrea Pavan (born 1989), Italian professional golfer
- Andrea Pavani (born 1954), Italian male curler
- Andrea Pazienza (1956–1988), Italian comics artist
- Andrea Pazzagli (1960–2011), Italian footballer
- Andrea Peana (born 1986), Italian footballer
- Andrea Pegoraro (born 1966), Italian pole vaulter
- Andrea Pelamatti (born 2004), Russian footballer
- Andrea Pellegrino (born 1997), Italian tennis player
- Andrea Pennacchi (born 1969), Italian actor
- Andrea Petagna (born 1995), Italian footballer
- Andrea Petrucci (born 1991), Italian footballer
- Andrea Pezzi (born 1973), Italian TV presenter and entrepreneur
- Andrea Piardi (born 1992), Italian rugby union referee
- Andrea Piccini (born 1978), Italian racing driver and team manager
- Andrea Piccolo (born 2001), Italian cyclist
- Andrea Piechele (born 1987), Italian cyclist
- Andrea Pierbenedetti, Italian Roman Catholic prelate
- Andrea Pierobon (born 1969), Italian footballer and coach
- Andrea Pieroni (ethnobotanist), Italian academic
- Andrea Pieroni (politician) (born 1958), Italian politician
- Andrea Pietrobon (born 1999), Italian racing cyclist
- Andrea Pilzer (born 1991), Italian curler
- Andrea Pinamonti (born 1999), Italian footballer
- Andrea Pininfarina (1957–2008), Italian engineer and manager
- Andrea Pinton (born 1996), Italian footballer
- Andrea Pirlo (born 1979), Italian football player
- Andrea Pisano (water polo) (born 1961), Italian water polo player
- Andrea Pisano (c. 1270–1348), Italian sculptor and architect
- Andrea Pisanu (born 1982), Italian footballer
- Andrea Pizzitola (born 1992), French racing driver
- Andrea Giacomo Podesta, Italian engraver and painter
- Andrea Poli (born 1989), Italian footballer
- Andrea Polinori (c. 1586–1648), Italian painter
- Andrea Portera (born 1973), Italian composer
- Andrea Pozzato (born 1988), Italian footballer
- Andrea Pozzi, Italian painter
- Andrea Pozzo (1642–1709), Italian Jesuit, painter and architect
- Andrea Prader (1919–2001), renowned Swiss scientist and physician, co-discoverer of the Prader-Willi syndrome
- Andrea Prat (born 1967), Italian economist
- Andrea Pratichetti (born 1988), Italian rugby union player
- Andrea Previtali (c. 1475–1528), Italian Renaissance painter
- Andrea Procaccini (1671–1734), Italian painter
- Andrea Procaccio (born 1996), Italian footballer
- Andrea Prodan (born 1961), Italian composer
- Andrea Prosperetti (born 1944), Italian physicist, member of the U.S. National Academy of Engineering
- Andrea Purgatori (1953–2023), Italian writer
- Andrea Rabagliati (c. 1843–1930), British physician and author
- Andrea Rabino (born 1978), Italian sprinter
- Andrea Rabito (born 1980), Italian footballer
- Andrea Raccagni (born 2004), Italian cyclist
- Andrea Radrizzani (born 1974), Italian businessman
- Andrea Raggi (born 1984), Italian footballer
- Andrea Raimondi (born 1990), Italian footballer
- Andrea Ranocchia (born 1988), Italian footballer
- Andrea Rapicio, Italian bishop and jurist
- Andrea Razmadze (1889–1929), Georgian mathematician
- Andrea Razzitti (born 1989), Italian footballer
- Andrea Renzullo (born 1996), German singer of Italian descent
- Andrea Riccardi (born 1950), Italian politician
- Andrea Riccio (bishop) (died 1515), Italian Roman Catholic bishop
- Andrea Riccio (1470–1532), Italian sculptor and architect
- Andrea Riggio (1660–1717), Italian Roman Catholic bishop
- Andrea Righi (born 1979), Italian swimmer
- Andrea Rinaldi (2000–2020), Italian footballer
- Andrea Risolo (born 1996), Italian footballer
- Andrea Rispoli (born 1956), Italian footballer
- Andrea Rizzoli (1914–1983), Italian editor and publisher
- Andrea Robbi (1864–1945), Swiss artist
- Andrea Rocca (born 1969), Italian composer
- Andrea Rocchelli (1983–2014), Italian photojournalist
- Andrea Rolla (born 1983), Italian swimmer
- Andrea Romagnoli (born 1998), Italian footballer
- Andrea Romeo (born 1985), Italian canoeist
- Andrea Romitti (1919–2007), Italian footballer
- Andrea Romizi (born 1979), Italian politician and mayor
- Andrea Roncato (born 1947), Italian actor, comedian and TV personality
- Andrea Ronchi (born 1955), Italian politician
- Andrea Rossini (born 1990), Italian footballer
- Andrea Rubei (born 1966), Italian futsal player
- Andrea Ruggeri (born 1982), Italian international relations scholar
- Andrea Russotto (born 1988), Italian footballer
- Andrea Sabbatini (1480–1535), Italian painter
- Andrea Sacchi (1599–1661), Italian painter
- Andrea Salsedo (1881–1920), Italian anarchist
- Andrea Saltelli (born 1953), Italian researcher
- Andrea Salvadori (1591–1634), Italian writer
- Andrea Salvietti (born 1952), Italian canoeist
- Andrea Salvisberg (born 1989), Swiss triathlete
- Andrea Sammaritani (born 1957), Sammarinese cross-country skier
- Andrea Sansovino (c. 1467–1529), Italian sculptor
- Andrea Santarelli (born 1993), Italian fencer
- Andrea Saraniti (born 1988), Italian footballer
- Andrea Sartoretti (born 1971), Italian volleyball player
- Andrea Sassetti (born 1960), Italian shoe designer and businessman
- Andrea Sbraga (born 1992), Italian footballer
- Andrea Scacciati (c. 1642–1704), Italian painter
- Andrea Scanavacca (born 1973), Italian former rugby union player
- Andrea Scarpa (born 1987), Italian boxer
- Andrea Lorenzo Scartazzini (born 1971), Swiss composer
- Andrea Schenetti (born 1991), Italian footballer
- Andrea Schera (born 1997), Italian canoeist
- Andrea Meldolla (1510/1515–1563), also known as Andrea Schiavone or Andrija Medulic, was a Dalmatian Renaissance painter and etcher
- Andrea Schiavone (footballer) (born 1993), Italian footballer
- Andréa Schifano (born 1991), Belgian footballer
- Andrea Scicchitano (born 1992), Italian footballer
- Andrea Scotti (1931–2003), Italian film and TV actor
- Andrea Scrugli (born 1992), Italian footballer
- Andrea Scutellari, Italian painter
- Andrea Seculin (born 1990), Italian footballer
- Andrea Seghizzi, Italian painter
- Andrea Segre (born 1976), Italian film director
- Andrea Sella, Italian-born chemist
- Andrea Semini (c. 1525–1594), Italian painter
- Andrea Seno (born 1966), Italian footballer
- Andrea Servi (1984–2013), Italian footballer
- Andrea Servili (born 1975), Italian footballer and coach
- Andrea Settembre (born 2001), Italian singer-songwriter
- Andrea Settembrini (born 1991), Italian footballer
- Andrea Shundi (1934–2024), Albanian-American agronomist
- Andrea Signorini (born 1990), Italian footballer
- Andrea Silenzi (born 1966), Italian footballer
- Andrea Silipo (born 2001), Italian football player
- Andrea Sironi (born 1964), Italian economist
- Andrea Smorti, Italian developmental psychologist
- Andrea Soddu (born 1974), Italian politician
- Andrea Solari (c. 1460–1524), Renaissance painter
- Andrea Soldi (c. 1703–1771), Italian painter
- Andrea Soncin (born 1978), Italian footballer and manager
- Andrea Sorrentino (born 1982), Italian comic book artist
- Andrea Sottil (born 1974), Italian football player and manager
- Andrea Spagni (1716–1788), Italian theologian
- Andrea Staffolani (born 1983), Italian footballer
- Andrea Stella (born 1971), Italian engineer and motorsport executive
- Andrea Stoppini (born 1980), Italian tennis player
- Andrea Stramaccioni (born 1976), Italian footballer and manager
- Andrea Superti-Furga, Swiss-Italian pediatrician, geneticist and molecular biologist
- Andrea Suppa, Italian painter
- Andrea Sussi (born 1973), Italian professional footballer
- Andrea Tabanelli (footballer) (born 1990), Italian footballer
- Andrea Tabanelli (1961–2020), Italian wheelchair curler
- Andrea Tacchi (born 1956), Italian luthier
- Andrea Tacquet (1612–1660), Flemish mathematician and Jesuit priest whose work prepared the ground for the eventual discovery of the calculus
- Andrea Tarlao, Italian Paralympic cyclist
- Andrea Tarozzi (born 1973), Italian footballer
- Andrea Tavernier (1858–1932), Italian painter
- Andrea Tecchio (born 1987), Italian footballer
- Andrea Terzi (1842–1918), Italian painter and engraver
- Andrea Tesoniero (born 1988), Italian footballer
- Andrea Tessiore (born 1999), Italian footballer
- Andrea Tessitore (born 1973), Italian lawyer and entrepreneur
- Andrea Testa, Italian para-canoeist
- Andrea Tiberi (born 1985), Italian cyclist
- Andrea Tidona (born 1951), Italian voice actor
- Andrea Tirali (c. 1657–1737), Italian architect
- Andrea Tiritiello (born 1995), Italian footballer
- Andrea Toniato (born 1991), Italian swimmer
- Andrea Toniatti (born 1992), Italian bicycle racer
- Andrea Tonoli (born 1991), Italian composer and musician
- Andrea Tonti (born 1976), Italian cyclist
- Andrea Toresani (1727–1760), Italian Baroque painter
- Andrea Tornielli (born 1964), Italian journalist and religious writer
- Andrea Leone Tottola (died 1831), Italian opera librettist
- Andrea Tozzo (born 1992), Italian footballer
- Andrea Traini (born 1992), Italian basketball player
- Andrea Trainotti (born 1993), Italian footballer
- Andrea Trani (born 1977), Italian yacht racer
- Andrea Tranquilli (born 1986), Italian rower
- Andrea Tremaglia (born 1987), Italian politician
- Andrea Trinchieri (born 1968), Italian professional basketball coach
- Andrea Tripicchio (born 1996), Italian footballer
- Andrea Tummiolo (born 1984), Italian footballer
- Andrea Turini, Italian physician and writer
- Andrea Ulmi (born 1957), Italian politician
- Andrea Vaccà Berlinghieri (1772–1826), Italian surgeon
- Andrea Vaccaro (1604–1670), Italian painter
- Andrea Vaccher (born 1988), Italian cyclist
- Andrea Vallocchia (born 1997), Italian footballer
- Andrea Vanni, Italian painter
- Andrea Vaturi (born 1982), Italian ice dancer
- Andrea Vavassori (born 1995), Italian tennis player
- Andrea Veggio (1923–2020), Italian Roman Catholic bishop
- Andrea Vendrame (born 1994), Italian cyclist
- Andrea Vendramin, doge of Venice
- Andrea Venturini (born 1996), Italian footballer
- Andrea Verdina (born 1969), Italian equestrian
- Andrea Verga (1811–1895), Italian psychiatrist
- Andrea Vergani (born 1997), Italian swimmer
- Andrea Veroli (died 1478), Italian Roman Catholic bishop
- Andrea Vescovi (born 1994), Italian sport shooter
- Andrea Vicentino (c. 1542–1617), Italian painter
- Andrea Vici (1743–c. 1817), Italian architect and engineer
- Andrea Vignali (born 1991), Italian footballer
- Andrea Vinai (1824–1893), Italian painter
- Andrea Vitali (born 1956), Italian writer
- Andrea Viterbi (born 1935), Italian-American scientist and engineer
- Andrea Viviano (1904–1962), Italian footballer
- Andrea Volpi (born 1981), Italian politician
- Andrea Vuerich (1907–1964), Italian cross-country skier
- Andrea Zaccagno (born 1997), Italian footballer
- Andrea Zafferani (born 1982), Sammarinese politician
- Andrea Zambelli (1927–1994), Italian bobsledder
- Andrea Zambonin (born 2000), Italian rugby union player
- Andrea Zanchetta (born 1975), Italian footballer
- Andrea Zani (1696–1757), Italian composer
- Andrea Zanoni (born 1965), Italian politician
- Andrea Zanzotto (1921–2011), Italian poet
- Andrea Zerini (born 1988), Italian basketball player
- Andrea Zinali (born 1969), Italian windsurfer
- Andrea Zini (born 1998), Italian footballer
- Andrea Zordan (born 1992), Italian cyclist
- Andrea Zorzi (born 1965), Italian volleyball player

=== Multiple people with the same surname ===
- Andrea Adamo
- Andrea Aguilera
- Andrea Álvarez
- Andrea Arrigoni
- Andrea Bacchetti
- Andrea Bellini
- Andrea Benetti
- Andrea Benítez
- Andrea Brown
- Andrea Caroppo
- Andrea Conti
- Andrea Cornaro
- Andrea Corsini
- Andrea Cossu
- Andrea Crespo
- Andrea Dandolo
- Andrea De Marchi
- Andrea di Firenze
- Andrea Dotti
- Andrea Favilli
- Andrea Fernández
- Andrea Ferrara
- Andrea Ferrari
- Andrea Ferretti
- Andrea Gill
- Andrea Goldsmith
- Andrea González
- Andrea Green
- Andrea Guerra
- Andrea Gutierrez
- Andrea Hernández
- Andrea Kelly
- Andrea Lawrence
- Andrea Lazzari
- Andrea Lee
- Andrea Lewis
- Andrea Lloyd
- Andrea Longo
- Andrea Martin
- Andrea Mason
- Andrea Massa
- Andrea Milani
- Andrea Miller
- Andrea Müller
- Andrea Neumann
- Andrea Peron
- Andrea Pisani
- Andrea Ramírez
- Andrea Renzi
- Andrea Robinson
- Andrea Rodrigues
- Andrea Romano
- Andrea Rossi
- Andrea Rosso
- Andrea Sala
- Andrea Sánchez
- Andrea Smith
- Andrea Suárez
- Andrea Tafi
- Andrea Thomas
- Andrea Valentini
- Andrea Vassallo
- Andrea Weiss
- Andrea Williams

== Fictional characters ==
- Andrea, a character in The Walking Dead
- Andrea Cantillo, a character from Breaking Bad
- Andrea Marino, a character from Ghost Whisperer
- Andrea Margulies (Rubbermaid), a mutant character in the Marvel Universe
- Andrea "Andy" McNally, a character from Rookie Blue
- Andrea Waltham, Emily's mother in NBC sitcom Friends
- Andrea Young, a character from the book series, My Weird School
- Andrea Zuckerman, a character on "Beverly Hills 90210'’
- Andrew DeLuca, (real name Andrea) a Doctor in '’Grey's Anatomy"

== Sources ==
- Istituto Nazionale di Statistica (2004). "Natalità e fecondità della popolazione residente: caratteristiche e tendenze recenti" (PDF) (in Italian). p. 11. Archived from the original (PDF) on 2006-10-01.
- "Classical Greek Online Base Form Dictionary". Archived from the original on 2013-10-23.
