= Szilasi =

Szilasi is a Hungarian surname. Notable people with the surname include:

- Alex Szilasi (born 1968), Hungarian-Italian pianist
- Andrea Szilasi (born 1964), Canadian photographer
- Gabor Szilasi (1928–2026), Hungarian-born Canadian photographer
