= Andrea Massa =

Andrea Massa may refer to:

- Andrea Massa (bishop), 17th century Roman Catholic bishop
- Andrea Massa (electrical engineer), professor at the University of Trento
