= Andrea Grobocopatel =

Argentine economist

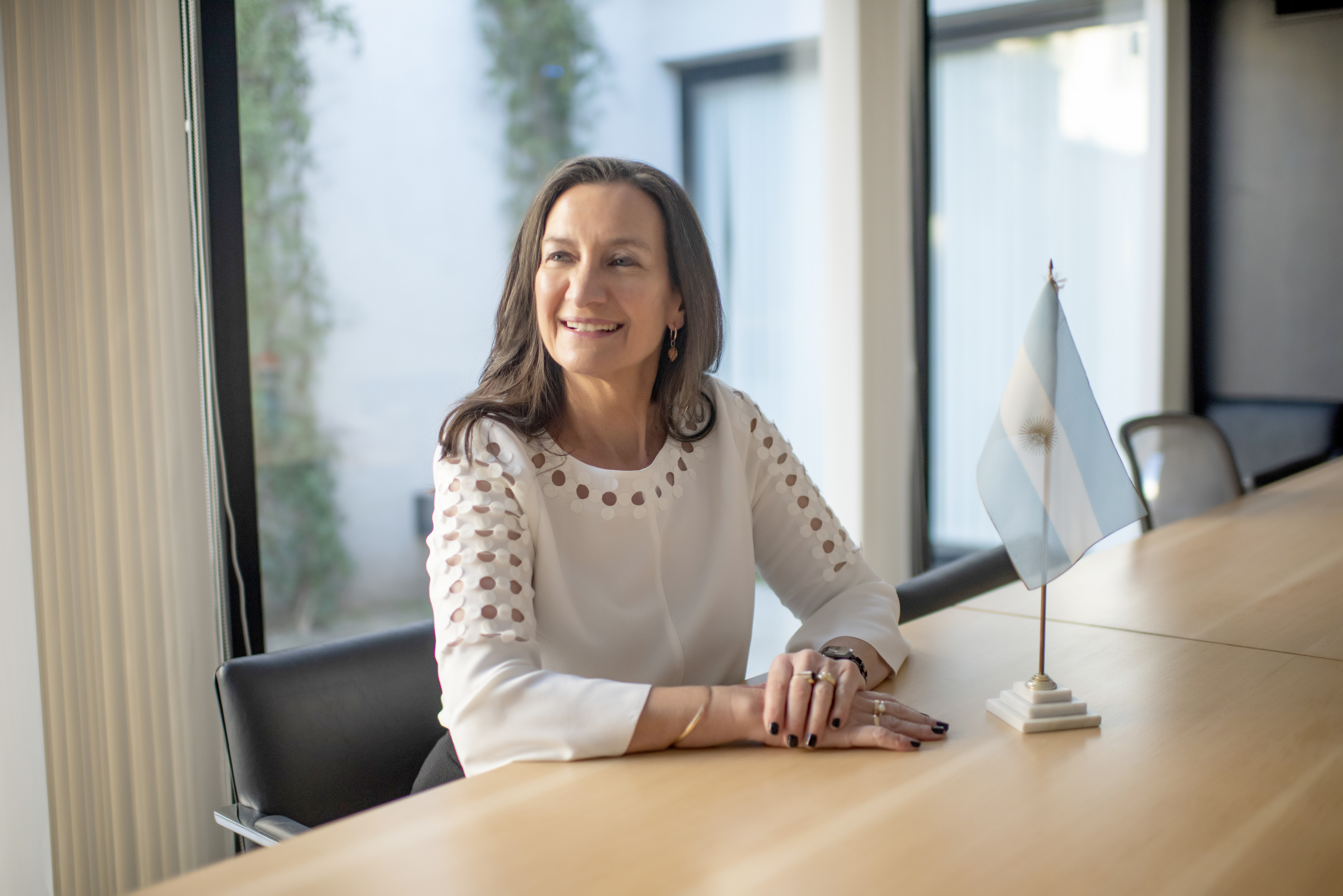
Andrea Grobocopatel at her office in Carlos Casares

Andrea Grobocopatel is an Argentine businesswoman, economist, and philanthropist who founded Fundación FLOR and Resiliencia SGR.

== Early life and education ==
Grobocopatel was born in 1964 in Carlos Casares, Buenos Aires. She attended the University of Buenos Aires from 1982 to 1985, obtaining a B.S. in economics.

== Family ==
Grobocopatel married Walter Sergio Torchio in 1988, who was mayor of their home city Carlos Casares from 2011 to 2021. They have four children and one grandson.

== Activities ==
Currently, she is the founder and shareholder of several enterprises, President of Ampatel (agricultural and livestock company), and Resiliencia SGR, which provides financial services for entrepreneurs and SMEs, especially women-owned ones.

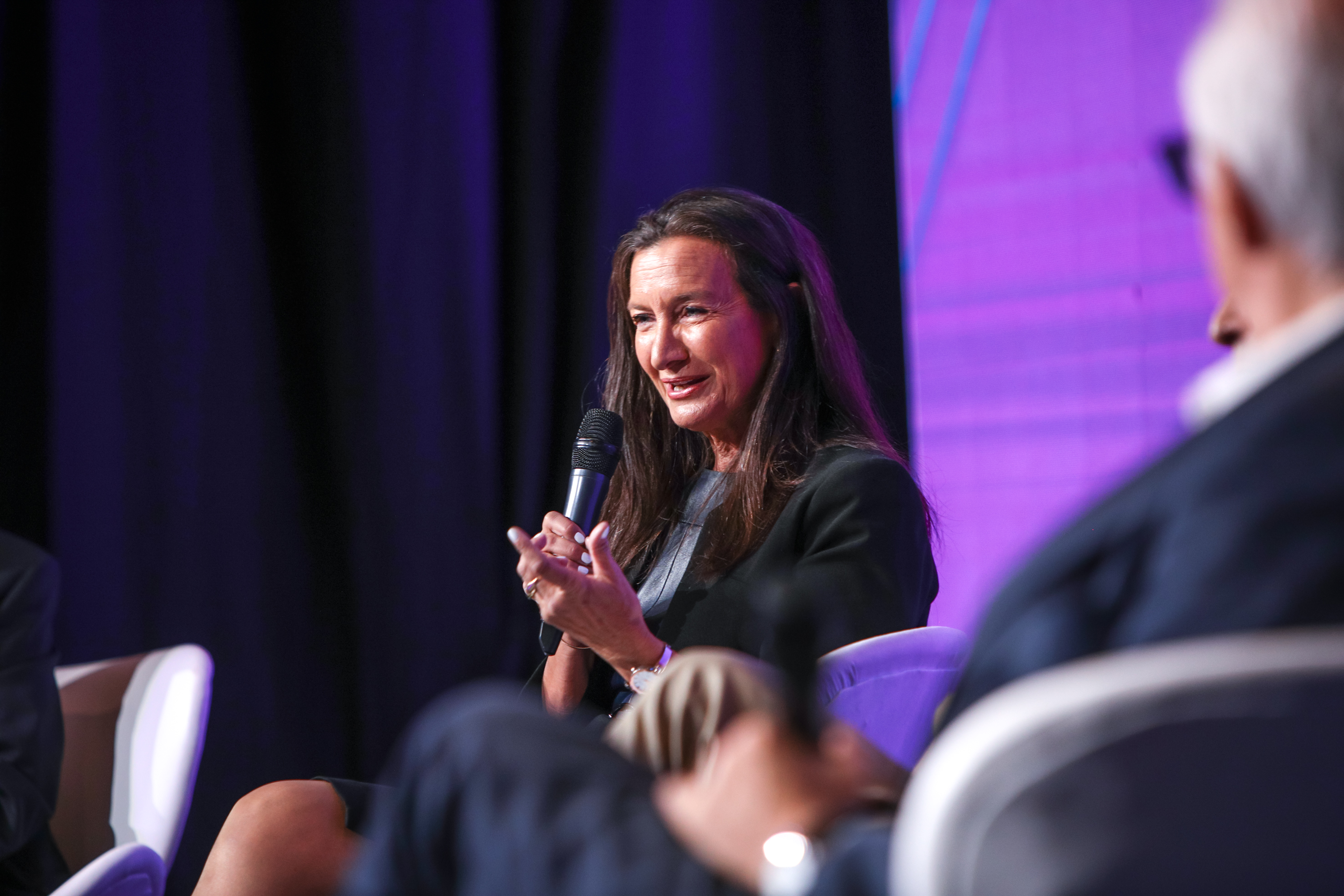
Andrea in Excelencia conference

She is also president and founder of Fundación FLOR, a network that promotes the training and transformation of responsible leaders to build sustainable, diverse, inclusive, and equitable organizations. Its key topics are leadership; responsible organizations; diversity; gender equality.

Andrea has been working on promoting gender equality for more than two decades. Her concerns about the gender gap in labor and economic inclusion have led her to actively advocate for women's autonomy and for making visible their unequal contribution to domestic work. Grobocopatel has been an advisor for companies, governments as well as decision-makers on women and care work.

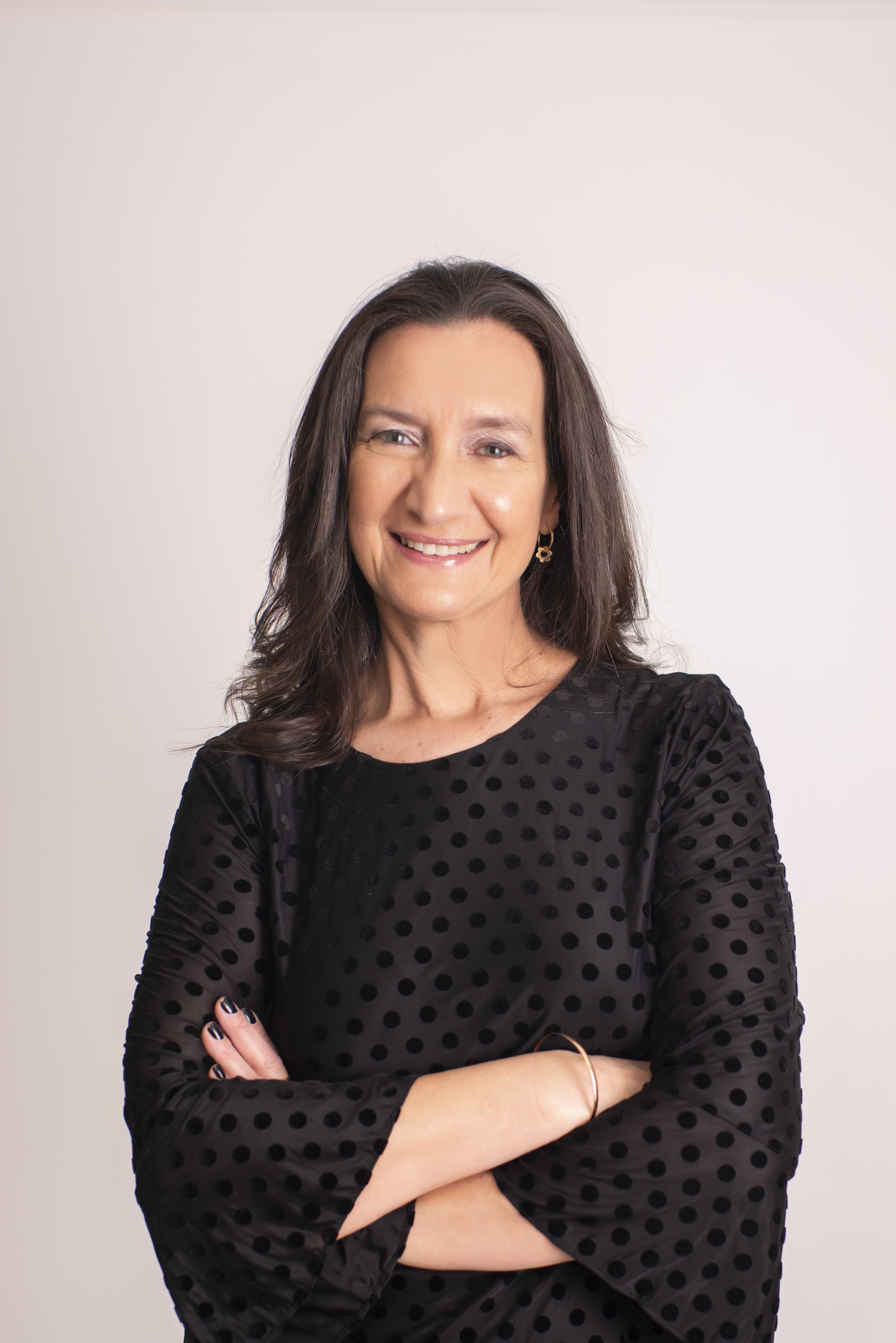
Andrea Grobocopatel

Her career as a gender equality advocate led her to be the G20 Empower Representative, the G20 Alliance for Empowerment and Progression of Women's Economic Representation. She was co-chair of the W20, a high-level advisory group of the G20, whose objective is to influence G20 countries on embracing gender in their public policy decisions. Currently, she is a delegate for the W20's International Dialogue Process. In the international sphere, she has also participated in the WEF (World Economic Forum), the CSW (Commission on the Status of Women), the Ibero-American Summit organized by SEGIB (Ibero-American General Secretariat), and other international forums.

She is the first woman to associate at the Rotary Club Buenos Aires founded in 1919. Additionally, she is one of the few women who have been incorporated into the Business Council of the Faculty of Economic Sciences (University of Buenos Aires) and she has been a mentor of Vital Voices Global Partnership and is the author of Pasión por Hacer (Passion to do), her first book sharing personal lessons as a businesswoman, and Pasión por Reinventarse (Passion for Reinvention), a reflection on her transformative experience. Grobocopatel was recognized as ‘Innovative Leader of the Year by the Women in Agribusiness Summit 2014 and was named in Apolitical's top 100 most influential people in gender policy in 2018 and she also received the Distinguished Leadership for the Americas Award for Gender Equality and Disability Inclusion in 2024, at the IX Annual Leadership for the Americas Awards Gala of The Inter-American Dialogue. Featured by IFC as one of 20 trailblazers, extraordinary female business leaders from emerging and frontier markets from around the world in 2019. Grobocopatel holds a bachelor's degree in economics from the University of Buenos Aires, and she also has a Cochran Fellowship.
