= Andrea Vassallo =

Andrea Vassallo may refer to:

- Andrea Vassallo (architect) (1856–1928), Maltese architect
- Andrea Vassallo (footballer) (born 1997), Italian footballer
