= Andrea Lloyd =

Andrea Lloyd may refer to:

- Andrea Lloyd-Curry (born 1965), American former basketball player
- Andria Lloyd (born 1971), Jamaican sprinter
