= Andrea Derjaj =

Albanian boxer (born 1996)

Andrea Derjaj (born 26 February 1996) is an Albanian boxer who competes in the 91 kg weight division. He is a 3-time defending national champion in his weight division and is a member of Albania national youth team.
