= Andrea Bellini =

Andrea Bellini may refer to:

- Andrea Bellini (singer), Italian opera singer
- Andrea Bellini (curator) (born 1971), Italian contemporary art curator
