= Andrea Meikle =

New Zealand footballer (born 1963)

Personal information
- Full name: Andrea Meikle
- Date of birth: 18 November 1963 (age 62)

International career
Years	Team	Apps	(Gls)
1986	New Zealand	2	(0)

Andrea Meikle (née Crowther) (born 18 November 1963) is a former association football player who represented New Zealand at international level.

Meikle made her Football Ferns début in a 1–2 loss to Chinese Taipei on 2 April 1986, and made just one further appearance later that same year.
