= Andrea Martin (disambiguation) =

Andrea Martin (born 1947) is an American-Canadian actress and comedian

Andrea Martin may also refer to:

- Andrea Martin (canoeist) (born 1967), German canoeist
- Andrea Martin (musician) (1972−2021), American singer and composer
