= Andrea Busati =

Italian painter

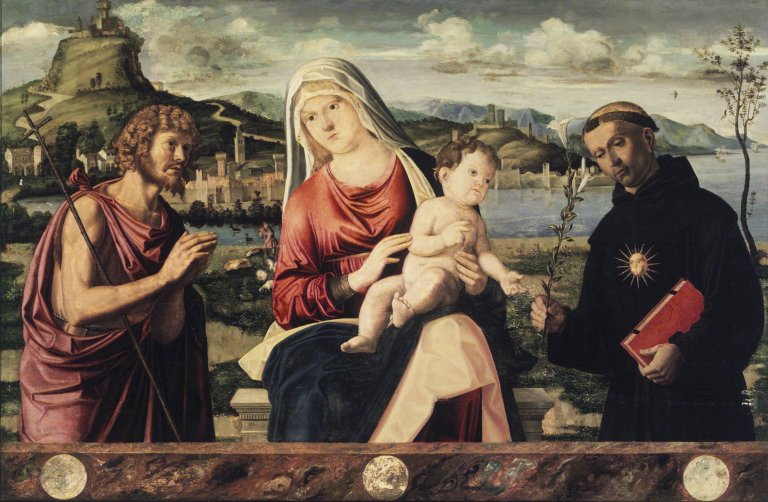
Andrea Busati, Madonna and Child with Saints John the Baptist and Nicholas of Tolentino, tempera and oil on poplar panel, 72.1 × 111.1 cm, ca. 1500. Brooklyn Museum

Andrea Busati di Stefano (fl. 1503–1528) was an Italian painter of Albanian origin during the Renaissance period. Andrea was the son of Stefano Busati who had fled to Venice from Albania. He was a follower of the Giovanni Bellini, is the author of a signed St. Mark enthroned between SS. Francis and Andrew, painted about 1510, and now in the Gallerie dell'Accademia in Venice. A figure of a Saint in the Vicenza Gallery is also ascribed to him.
