= Andrea Lehmann =

German artist

Andrea Lehmann (born 1975) is an artist based in Germany.

Andrea Lehmann was born in Düsseldorf. She attended the Kunstakademie in Düsseldorf in 1995 and gained her MA in 2000.

She has shown work in exhibitions including the Anna Klinkhammer in Düsseldorf, and at the Kulturministerium, Prague. She has also exhibited at The Rubell Museum, Jack Tilton (New York), Michael+Susan Hort Collection (New York), Saatchi Gallery (London), Mera and Don Rubell (Miami), Museum of Glass (Tacoma), and Kravetz/Wehby Gallery (New York).

== General references ==
- Tewes, Johanna (2010): Phantastische Bildwelten zwischen Gothic, Kitsch und Mythologie. Die künstlerischen Strategien Andrea Lehmanns und ihre didaktischen Schnittstellen (KONTEXT: Kunst - Vermittlung - Kulturelle Bildung, Band 5). ISBN 978-3-8288-2145-3.
