= Andrea Massa (electrical engineer) =

Italian electronics engineer

Andrea Massa is an Italian electronics engineer, researcher and a full professor at University of Trento. He was named an IEEE Fellow by the IEEE Antennas & Propagation Society in 2018.

He is an editorial board member for the Journal of Electromagnetic Waves and Applications and a past editorial board member for the International Journal of Microwave and Wireless Technologies. He is a past associate editor of IEEE Transactions on Antennas and Propagation.
