= Andrea Aguilera =

Andrea Aguilera may refer to:

- Andrea Aguilera (Colombian model) (born 1997), Colombian model and beauty pageant titleholder
- Andrea Aguilera (Ecuadorian model) (born 2001), Ecuadorian model and beauty pageant titleholder
