= Andrea Renzi =

Andrea Renzi may refer to:

- Andrea Renzi (actor) (born 1963), Italian actor
- Andrea Renzi (basketball) (born 1989), Italian basketball player
