= Andréa Belliger =

Swiss theologian

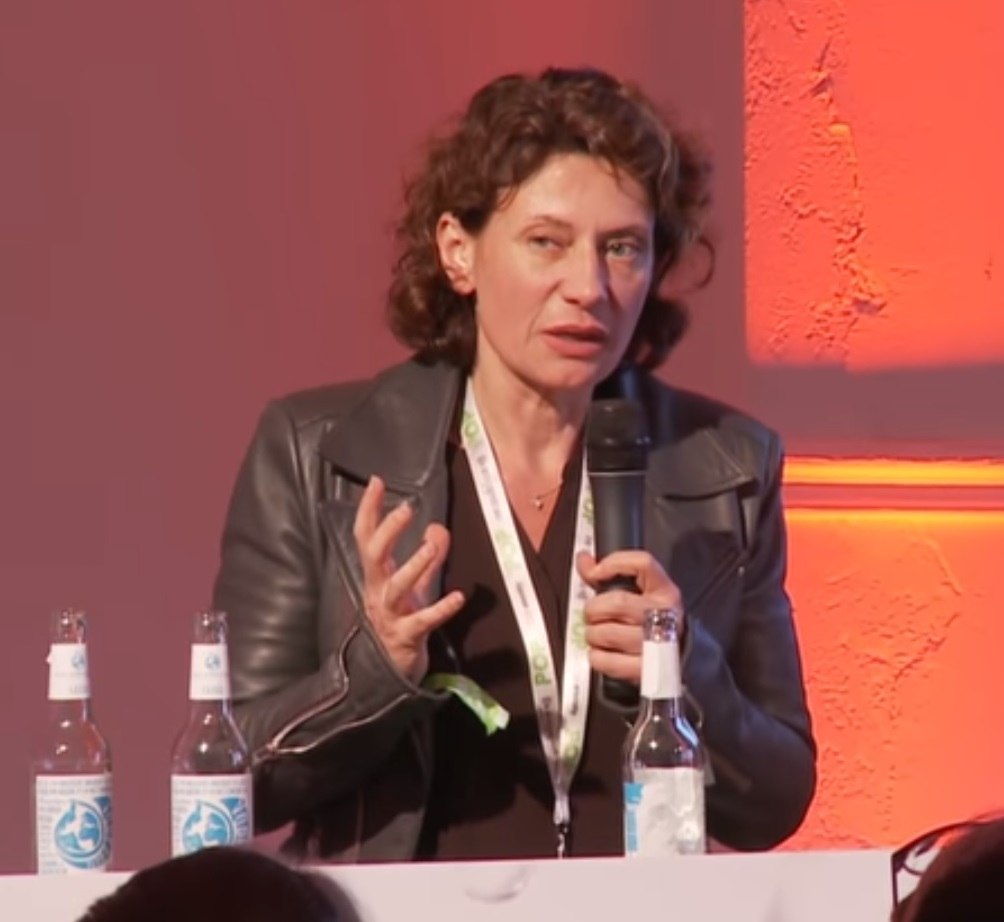
Andréa Belliger (2018)

Andréa Belliger (born 1970) is a Swiss theologian and entrepreneur.

== Early life and education ==
Belliger studied at the University of Lucerne, the University of Athens, and the University of Strasburg. She received her PhD in Theology and Canon Law from the University of Lucerne, Switzerland. Since 2006, she is Pro-rector of Services at the Teachers Training University of Central Switzerland in Lucerne, Switzerland. Together with her husband Prof. David Krieger and Prof. Treichel, she co-directs the Institute for Communication and Leadership, an independent training center located in Lucerne. 2016 she received her MBA (summa cum laude) from the ZfU International Business School in Zurich. She works as author, consultant and speaker in the area of digital transformation, with particular focus on new media, digital society, cyber culture, actor-network theory, ritual theory, ehealth, fintech, and organization theory.

== Selected bibliography ==
=== Editions ===
- Belliger, A., Krieger, D. J. (Eds.) (2014): Gesundheit 2.0. Das ePatienten Handbuch, transcript Verlag, Bielefeld, 2014. ISBN 978-3-8376-2807-4
- Belliger, A., Krieger, D. J. (Eds.) (2013); Ritualtheorien: Ein einführendes Handbuch, 5th edition, Springer VS Wiesbaden, 2013, ISBN 978-3-531-19499-8.
- Belliger, A., Krieger, D. J. (Eds.) (2006): ANThology: Ein einführendes Handbuch zur Akteur-Netzwerk-Theorie, transcript Verlag, Bielefeld, ISBN 3-89942-479-4.

=== Books ===
- Belliger, A., Krieger, D. J. (2014): Interpreting Networks - Hermeneutics, Actor-Network Theory & New Media, transcript Verlag, Bielefeld, ISBN 978-3-8376-2811-1.
- Belliger, A., Krieger, D. J. (2016): Organizing Networks - An Actor-Network Theory of Organizations, transcript Verlag, Bielefeld, ISBN 978-3-8376-3616-1.
- Belliger, A., Krieger, D. J. (2018): Network Publicy Governance - On Privacy and the Informational Self, transcript Verlag, Bielefeld, ISBN 978-3-8376-4213-1.

=== Articles ===
- Belliger, A. (2003): Public Understanding of Science. In: Proceedings of the 1st International Science & Society-Conference on Stem Cell Research. Volume 1 of the series Science & Society, Seismo Press, Zürich.
- Belliger, A. (2008): Article "Netzwerk," in: S. Farzin, S. Jordan (Eds.), Lexikon Soziologie und Sozialtheorie. Hundert Grundbegriffe, Reclam, Stuttgart. ISBN 978-3-15-019297-9.
- Belliger, A. (2008): Article "Ritual," in: S. Farzin, S. Jordan (Hrsg.), Lexikon Soziologie und Sozialtheorie. Hundert Grundbegriffe, Reclam, Stuttgart. ISBN 978-3-15-019297-9.
- Belliger, A. (2009): Virtuelle Grenzen und Räume in Organisationen, in: G. Thomann, B. Bucher, Th. Hagmann, R. Kuhn (Eds.), "Grenzmanagement," Resonanz – Gestalten von Organisationen in flüchtigen Zeiten, Bd. 1, hep-verlag, Bern.
- Belliger, A. (2012): On Networking – A Hermeneutics for the Digital Age, in: Constructivist Foundations Volume 8, Nr. 2.
- Belliger, A. (2013): Virtual Healing Architecture for ePatients, in: Healing Architecture, (Eds) Ch. Nickl-Weller, H. Nickl, Braun Verlag.
- Belliger, A., (2014): Netzwerke der Dinge (aus der Sicht der Akteur-Netzwerk-Theorie), in: Handbuch Materielle Kultur. Bedeutungen, Konzepte, Disziplinen, hrsg. v. S. Samida, M. K. H. Eggert, H. P. Hahn, (Eds.), Verlag J.B. Metzler, ISBN 9783476024640.
- Belliger, A. (2015): Die Selbstquantifizierung als Ritual virtualisierter Körperlichkeit, in: Körper und Ritual. Sozial- und kulturwissenschaftliche Zugänge und Analysen, hrsg. Von R. Gugutzer und M. Staack, Springer, Wiesbaden, 389–404.
- Belliger, A. (2016): From Quantified Self to Qualified Self - A Fictional Dialogue at the Mall, in: Quantified Selves Statistic Bodies, Digital Culture & Society Journal. P. Abend & M. Fuchs (Eds.), transcript Verlag: Bielefeld, S. 25–40. https://web.archive.org/web/20170716084641/http://www.transcript-verlag.de/978-3-8376-3210-1/digital-culture-und-society?c=1561
- Belliger, A. (2016): The End of Media – Reconstructing Media Studies on the Basis of Actor-Network Theory, in: Applying the Actor-Network Theory in Media Studies, B. Ochsner, M. Spöhrer (Eds.), IGI Global, Hershey, PA, S. 20–37 http://www.igi-global.com/book/applying-actor-network-theory-media/147546
- Belliger, A. (2016): Wenn das Territorium plötzlich der Cyberspace ist, in: im dialog / CSS, 3/2016, S. 8–9 https://www.dropbox.com/s/3sktpqftkg4e2jp/CSS_3_16_Hintergrund.pdf?dl=0
- Belliger, A. (2016): Digitale Transformation im Gesundheitswesen, in: Tagungsband zum 5. Nationalen Biobanken-Symposium der Technologie- und Methodenplattform für die vernetzte medizinische Forschung TMF, Berlin, Bd. 14 Schriftenreihe der TMF.
- Belliger, A. (2017): Connected Health – Connected Architecture, in: Tagungsband 6. Symposium Health Care der Zukunft – Livability of Health, Technische Universität Berlin.
