= Andrea Bondavalli =

Italian computer scientist (born 1960)

- Born: November 26, 1960 (age 65); Reggio Emilia, Italy
- Education: University of Pisa
- Known for: Work on dependability and resilience of critical systems and infrastructures
- Awards: IEEE TCHS Outstanding Leadership Award (2022), Laurea Honoris Causa from BME (2019)
- Scientific career
- Fields: Computer Science
- Workplaces: University of Florence

Andrea Bondavalli is a Full Professor of Computer Science at the University of Florence. He has previously held positions as a researcher and senior researcher at the National Research Council (Italy), working at the CNUCE Institute in Pisa.

== Education and career ==
Bondavalli obtained his degree in Computer Science from the University of Pisa. He spent a year at the University of Newcastle upon Tyne in the UK as a CNR-NATO fellow and has had visiting professorships at EPFL in Lausanne and the Budapest University of Technology and Economics.

== Research ==
His research focuses on the dependability and resilience of critical systems and infrastructures, particularly in safety, security, fault tolerance, and the evaluation of attributes such as reliability, availability, and performability. He has authored over 220 papers in international journals and conferences.

== Projects and collaborations ==
Bondavalli has led various national and European projects, including the Italian MIUR PRIN projects "DOTS-LCCI" and "TENACE," and European projects such as ESPRIT BRA 3092 PDCS, 6362 PDCS-2, among others. He is currently leading the FP7-ICT-2013-10-610535 "AMADEOS" project and the PIRSES-GA-2013-612569 "DEVASSES" as coordinator.

== Academic roles and honors ==
He is the leader of the Resilient Computing Lab (RCL) research group at the Department of Mathematics and Informatics (DIMAI) of the University of Florence. He is also a member of the ISO 26262 working group and serves on the editorial board of the International Journal of Critical Computer-Based Systems. He is also a senior member of the IEEE and the IFIP W.G. 10.4 working group on "Dependable Computing and Fault-Tolerance".

== Awards and recognition ==
Prof. Bondavalli has been recognized with several prestigious awards throughout his career. He was honored with the IEEE TCHS Outstanding Leadership Award from the IEEE Systems, Man, and Cybernetics (SMC) Technical Committee on Homeland Security (TCHS) on 24/07/2022. Additionally, he received a laurea honoris causa from the BME for his research dedicated to fault tolerance and the design of secure and reliable systems and networks, particularly cyber-physical systems. The ceremony took place at BME on May 25, 2019.

== Personal life ==
Bondavalli was born in Reggio Emilia on November 26, 1960. He is married with three children.
