= Andrea Goldsmith =

Andrea Goldsmith may refer to:

- Andrea Goldsmith (engineer), American electrical engineer
- Andrea Goldsmith (writer) (born 1950), Australian writer and novelist
