= Andrea Olcese =

Radio host and TV showrunner

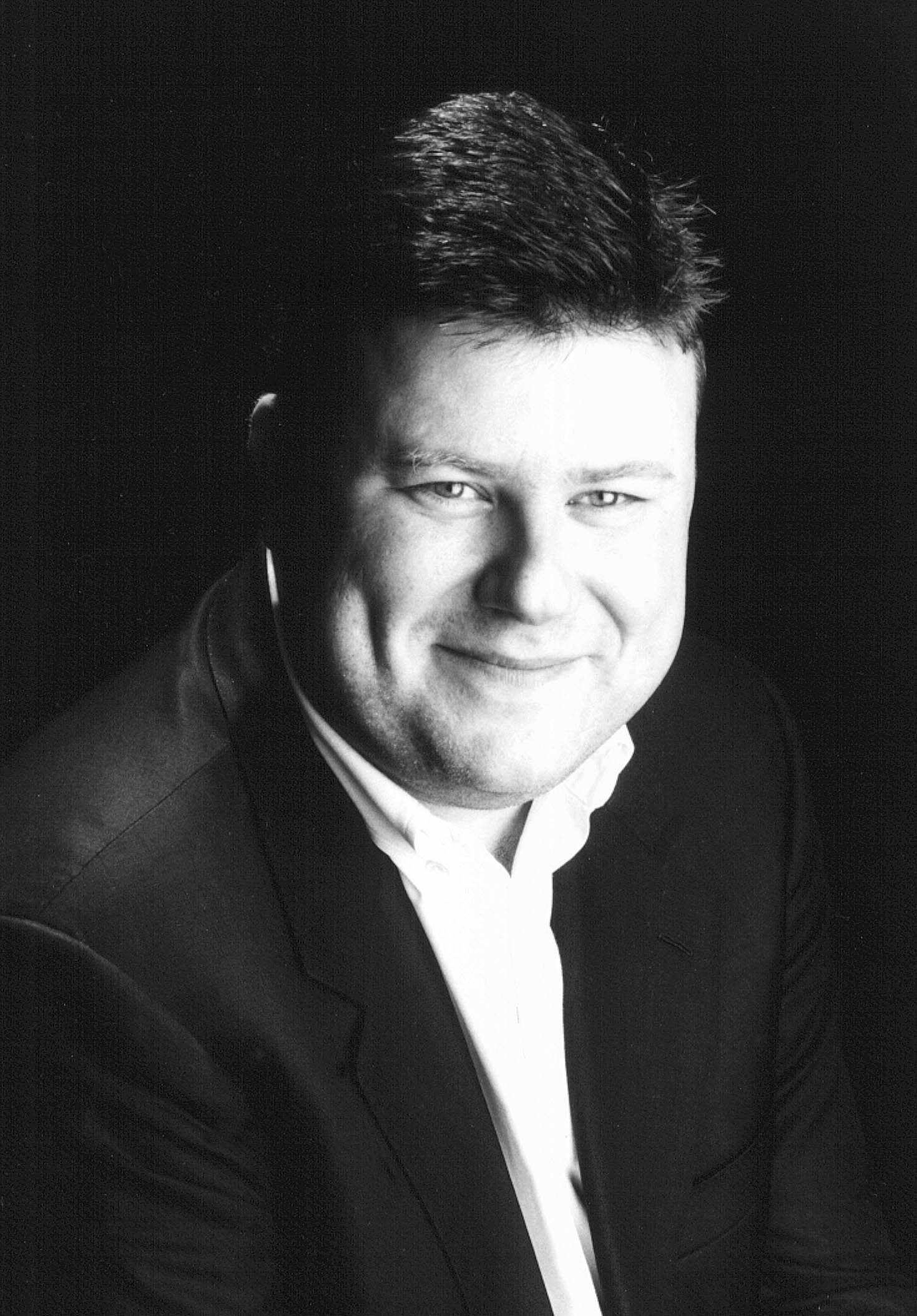
- Born: 1963 (age 62–63)
- Occupations: Showrunner; Writer

Andrea Olcese, born in Alessandria in 1963, is an Italian radio and television showrunner.

== Early life ==
Andrea Olcese was born in 1963. His father was Cav. Dr. Achille Olcese, a medical practitioner that practiced in military hospitals.

== Career ==
Starting his career as a freelance journalist, writing for publications including the European Rolling Stone Magazine. Olcese wrote the book Internationalists: Introducing the Style Council, published on Riot Stories in 1985. In the late 1980s Olcese was the producer of the radio show “Rock Café” on SPER, syndicated through Italy with a daily audience of about 2.5 million listeners. In the summer of 1987, he started contributing to the TV series Hit Parade on RAIUNO named Hit Parade, which he also continued in the next season, as Discoring. In the early 1990s, he created the Top 40 music show Europop, which popularized several European born pop acts in a market previously saturated in English and American music.

During the 1990s he transitioned to television broadcasting, including the television program Rock Cafè. He also cowrote a book published about the show entitled Don Gelmini Incontra La Musica Italiana a Rock Cafe. In 1994 Olcese cofounded the television production company Einstein Multimedia with Luca Josi, where Olcese serves as CEO. He has also partnered with Brazilian networks to produce programs in Portuguese. During the 1990s Olcese was the showrunner of the shows Passaparola, Sarabanda, Novecento, Quiz Show, Agrodolce, and Love Bugs. He was also behind the 2000s Italian version of Top of the Pops broadcast on Rai 2.

In 2005 Olcese was the producer of the Italian production of Live 8. Over his career his television productions have earned him 5 Telegatto awards.
