= Andrea Peron =

Andrea Peron is the name of two Italian cyclists:

- Andrea Peron (cyclist, born 1971)
- Andrea Peron (cyclist, born 1988)
