= Andrea Robinson =

Andrea Robinson may refer to:

- Andrea Robinson (singer), American singer and voice actress
- Andrea Robinson (sommelier) (born 1964), American sommelier and chef
