= Andrea Benítez =

Andrea Benítez may refer to:

- Andrea Benítez (tennis) (born 1986), Argentine tennis player
- Andrea Benítez (skateboarder) (born 1994), Spanish professional skateboarder
