= Andrea Arrigoni =

Andrea Arrigoni may refer to:

- Andrea Arrigoni (footballer) (born 1988), Italian footballer
- Andrea Arrigoni (serial killer) (1969–2005), Italian serial killer
