= Andrea Valentini =

Andrea Valentini may refer to:

- Andrea Valentini (designer) (born 1961), American designer
- Andrea Valentini (pentathlete) (born 1977), Italian modern pentathlete
