= Andrea Corsini =

Andrea Corsini may refer to:

- Andrew Corsini (1302–1373), Italian saint
- Andrea Corsini (cardinal) (1735–1795), Italian cardinal
