= Andrea Favilli =

Andrea Favilli may refer to:

- Andrea Favilli (sculptor) (born 1963), American sculptor
- Andrea Favilli (footballer) (born 1997), Italian footballer
