= Andrea Sánchez =

Andrea Sánchez may refer to:

- Andrea Sánchez (footballer) (born 1994), Mexican football right-back for Juárez
- Andrea Sánchez Falcón (born 1997), Spanish football midfielder for Benfica
