= Andrea Benetti =

Andrea Benetti may refer to:

- Andrea Benetti (canoeist) (born 1980), Italian slalom canoeist
- Andrea Benetti (artist) (born 1964), Italian painter
