= Andrea Weiss =

Andrea Weiss may refer to:

- Andrea Weiss (rabbi) (1965–2026), American rabbi and author
- Andrea Weiss (filmmaker), American independent documentary filmmaker and author
