= Andrea Ferretti =

Andrea Ferretti may refer to:

- Andrea Ferretti (footballer, born 1985), Italian footballer who plays for Scandicci
- Andrea Ferretti (footballer, born 1986), Italian football striker for Borgo San Donnino
