= Andrea Gill =

Andrea Gill may refer to:

- Andrea Gill (politician), former president of the Senate of Belize
- Andrea Gill (artist), American ceramicist
