= Andrea Brown =

Andrea Brown may refer to:

- Andrea Brown (R&B singer) (born 1982), American pop and R&B singer
- Andrea Brown (soprano) (born 1973), American soprano
