= Andrea Fenzau-Lehmann =

German aviator

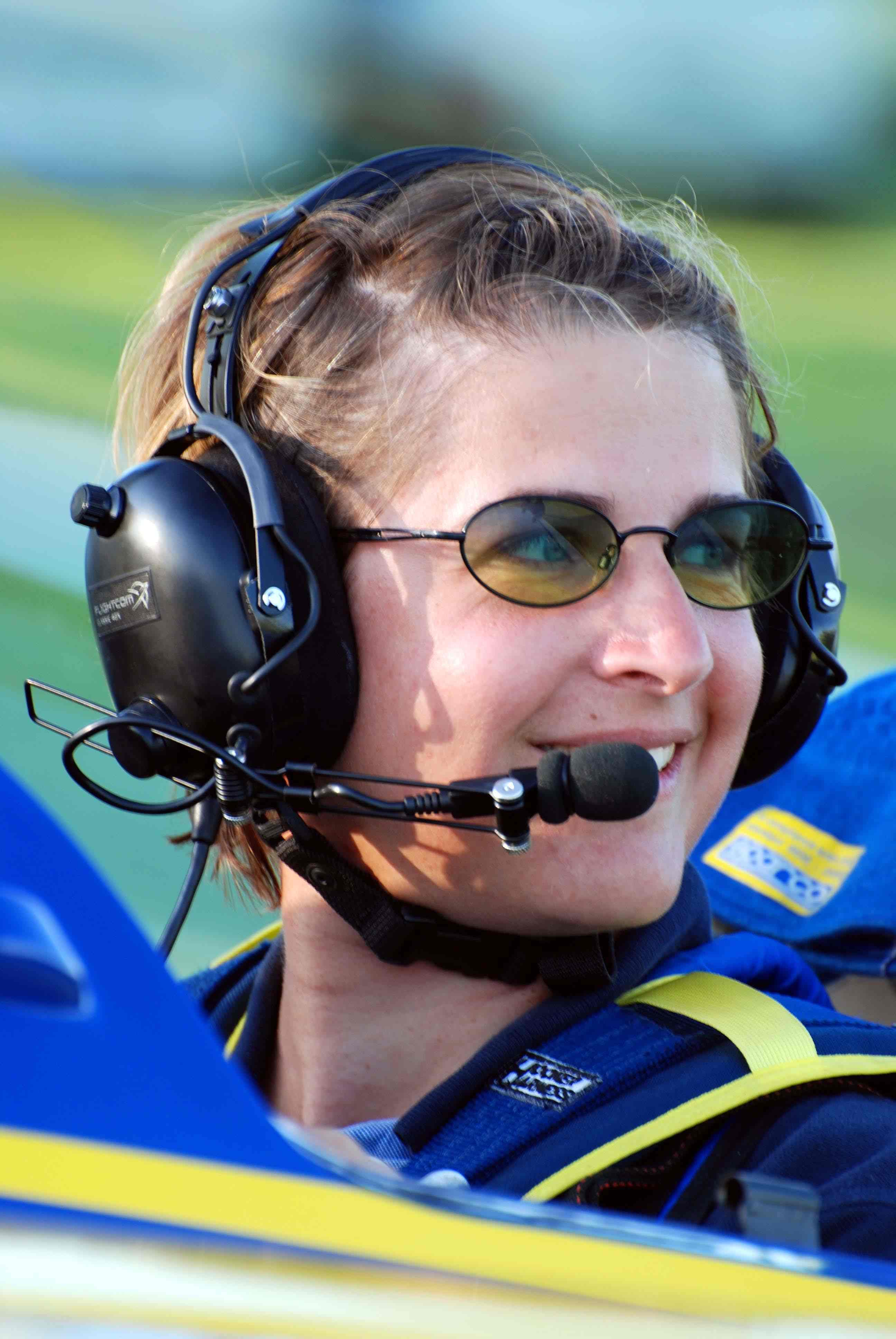
Andrea Fenzau-Lehmann

Andrea Fenzau-Lehmann is a German aviator. She holds licences for ultralight, motor glider and light aircraft, and specialises in gliding and gliding aerobatics. She has represented Germany at European and international gliding competitions.

== Life ==
Fenzau-Lehmann began flying in 1996. In 2003 she qualified as a flying instructor for gliding and glider aerobatics in the highest performance class of the sport, Unlimited Class. In 2006 she competed in the Swiss Aerobatic Gliding Association competition and was placed third. In 2009 she became a member of the German national glider aerobatics Unlimited Class team, the only woman in the team.
