= Andrea Bacchetti =

Andrea Bacchetti may refer to:

- Andrea Bacchetti (musician) (born 1977), Italian pianist
- Andrea Bacchetti (rugby union) (born 1988), Italian rugby union player
