= Andrea Rusnock =

American historian

Andrea Rusnock is a professor of history at the University of Rhode Island. She has published two books and numerous articles on science and medicine in the Enlightenment, quantification, public health and the environment, and the history of vaccination. Her work has been reviewed in Medical History: An International Journal for the History of Medicine and Related Sciences, EH.net of the Economic History Association, and The American Historical Review.

== Education and background ==
Rusnock earned her BA from Brown University in 1982. She then attended Princeton University, where she earned her MA in 1985 and her PhD in 1990.

== Publications ==
- 1996: The Correspondence of James Jurin (1684–1750), Physician and Secretary to the Royal Society', edited with an introduction, notes, and calendar of correspondence, Wellcome Institute Series in the History of Medicine (Amsterdam and Atlanta: Rodopi). ISBN 9042000473.
- 2002: Vital Accounts: Quantifying Health and Population in Eighteenth-Century England and France (Cambridge University Press). ISBN 0521803748.

== Awards ==
- 2006-2007: URI Center for the Humanities Faculty Sabbatical Fellowship, for her project "The Birth of Vaccination."
- 2013: American Council of Learned Societies Fellowship for her project The Birth of Vaccination: An Environmental History.
- 2014: Winner of the Award for Scholarly Works in Biomedicine and Health/Publications, US Department of Health and Human Services.
