= Andrea Fabiano =

Italian company executive

- Born: May 17, 1976 (age 49); Bari
- Title: Director

Andrea Fabiano (born May 17, 1976, in Bari) is an Italian company executive. He was the Director of Rai 2 from 18 February 2016 until 11 October 2017.

== Biography ==
He began his career at Rai in 1999 as a marketer. In 2015 he was appointed deputy director of Rai 1, and then became director in 2016, appointed by the director general of Rai Antonio Campo Dall'Orto. He is the youngest director in the history of Rai 1. He was then made Director in Rai 2.
