= Andrea Spofford =

American poet, essayist, and professor

Andrea Spofford (1986–present) is an American poet, essayist, and professor. Her most recent chapbook is Qikiqtagruk: Almost An Island (Red Bird Chapbooks, 2014). Her poems and essays have appeared in Vela Magazine, The Citron Review, Blood Orange Review, Red Paint Hill Poetry Journal, Sugar House Review, Composite Arts Review, The Coachella Review, The Oklahoma Review, and elsewhere. She is the poetry editor for Zone 3 Magazine.

Spofford grew up in Newcastle, California and Fort Collins, Colorado. She received a B.A. in English from Colorado State University (2006), an M.F.A. from the California Institute of the Arts (2009), and a Ph.D. from the University of Southern Mississippi (2013). In 2013, she participated in the Noatak National Preserve residency, making her first trek to Alaska. She is currently an Assistant Professor of Poetry at Austin Peay State University.

== Bibliography ==
=== Poetry collections ===
- Everything Combustible (Dancing Girl Press, 2013)
- Qikiqtagruk: Almost An Island (Red Bird Chapbooks, 2014)
