= Andrea Van de Kamp =

Los Angeles businesswoman and philanthropist

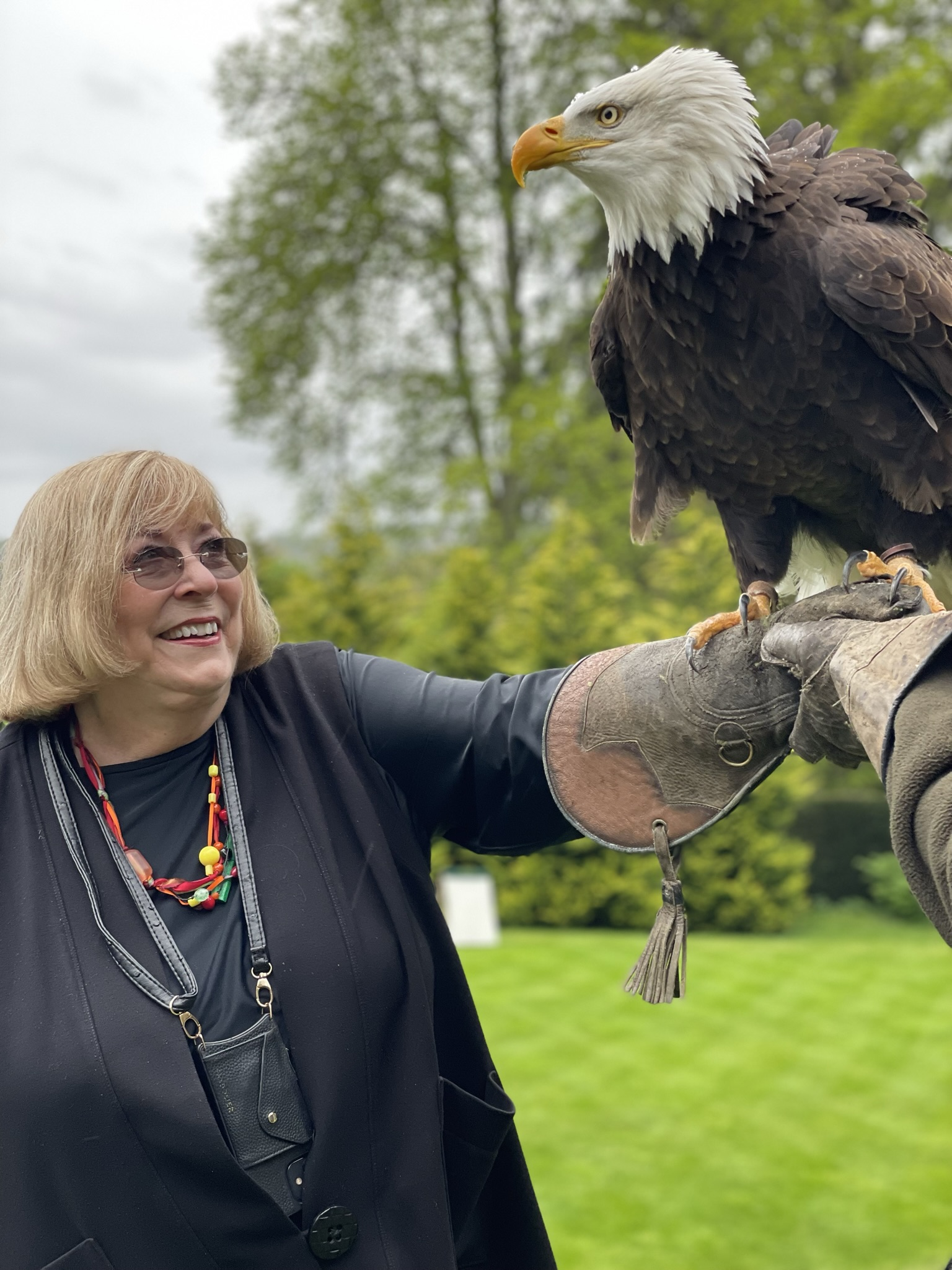
- Andrea Van de Kamp with eagle
- Born: Andrea Fisher
- Education: Michigan State University (BA); Teachers College, Columbia University (MA)
- Spouse: John Van de Kamp (1978–2017, death)

Andrea Van de Kamp (nee Fisher) is a Los Angeles businesswoman, philanthropist, fundraiser and civic leader. As chair of the operating committee of the city’s Music Center, she is credited with shepherding the Walt Disney Concert Hall to completion in 2003.

Van de Kamp held volunteer or leadership roles in several Southern California arts and philanthropic organizations, including the Downtown Women’s Center Los Angeles, the Music Center’s Blue Ribbon committee, A Noise Within Theatre and the Rose Bowl.

== Early life and education ==
Andrea Van de Kamp, born Andrea Fisher, was born in Detroit on July 28, 1943, in Detroit, Michigan to Andrew L. Messenger, a dermatologist, and Rosemary, a commercial artist. Her parents divorced when Van de Kamp was three, and she didn’t see her father again until she was 45.

Rosemary subsequently married Fred Stickel, an architect; they had a son, David, and a daughter, Cynthia. The family lived in Birmingham, Michigan. Van de Kamp was a cheerleader and tennis player in high school.

Van de Kamp earned a bachelor’s degree in history from Michigan State University in 1966. In 1972, she earned a Master of Arts degree from Teachers College, Columbia University.

== Business ==
Van de Kamp worked as director of recruitment at Columbia University in New York City from 1968 to 1971. She followed that as associate director of admissions at Dartmouth College from 1971 to 1974 and associate dean of admissions at Los Angeles’ Occidental College from 1974 to 1977.

In the 1970s, she also worked as executive director of The International Academy of Estate and Trust Law and executive director of the Southern California Coro Foundation.

In the 1980s, she served as director of development at the Museum of Contemporary Art, Los Angeles; director of public affairs for Carter Hawley Hale Stores; and president and CEO of the Independent Colleges of Southern California. She later worked as managing director of Sotheby's West Coast Operations and vice president of Sotheby's North America.

She has held board seats at City National Bank, the Jenny Craig Corp. and The Walt Disney Co.

== Philanthropy ==
Andrea Van de Kamp held several volunteer roles connected to the Music Center of Los Angeles, including volunteer chair, chair of the development committee and chair emeritus.

In 1987, Lillian Disney, an artist and wife of the late Walt Disney, donated $50 million to build a concert hall in downtown Los Angeles named for her husband. But by 1995, the building faced rising costs and a lack of capital.

As chair of the Music Center’s development committee, Van de Kamp spearheaded a major fundraising campaign to generate the estimated $264 million needed to complete the building. She partnered with billionaire philanthropist Eli Broad and Mayor Richard Riordan to meet that goal. The Walt Disney Concert Hall was completed and opened in October 2003.

Van de Kamp has also held leadership positions at other arts and philanthropic organizations, including a board seat at the UCLA Hammer Museum, vice chair at the California Council of the Humanities and co-chair of the Los Angeles Arts Task Force.

She has also served as chair of the Music Center Operating Co. and was a member of the center’s Blue Ribbon women's support group.

Van de Kamp also ran an endowment fundraiser for the Museum of Contemporary Art and served on the board of Los Angeles County Museum of Art.

== Awards ==
Van de Kamp received the Los Angeles Parks Foundation Rose Award and the Junior League of Los Angeles' Lifetime Community Achievement Award.

== Personal life ==
Andrea Van de Kamp met John Van de Kamp at a Dartmouth College event, and they married in 1978. Their daughter, Diana, was born in 1979. John died in 2017.

Van de Kamp lives in Los Angeles.
