= Andrea Tafi =

Andrea Tafi may refer to:

- Andrea Tafi (artist) (active 1300–1325)
- Andrea Tafi (cyclist) (born 1966)
