= Andrea Caroppo =

Andrea Caroppo may refer to:

- Andrea Caroppo (footballer) (born 1990), Italian footballer
- Andrea Caroppo (politician) (born 1979), Italian politician
