= Andrea Galasso =

Italian politician (1932–2022)

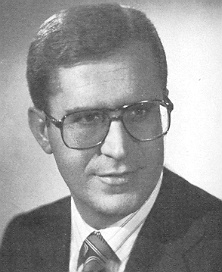

Member of the Chamber of Deputies of the Republic of Italy
- In office 15 March 1972 – 22 March 1983

Personal details
- Born: 10 November 1932 Naples, Italy
- Died: 12 August 2022 (aged 89) Naples, Italy
- Party: Forza Italia

Andrea Galasso (10 November 1932 – 12 August 2022) was an Italian politician.

== Biography ==
A member of the Forza Italia, he served in the Chamber of Deputies of the Republic of Italy from 1972 to 1983.

Galasso died from COVID-19 in August 2022, aged 89.
