= Andrea Dandolo (disambiguation) =

Andrea Dandolo (1306–1354) was the doge of Venice.

Andrea Dandolo may also refer to:

- Andrea Dandolo (died 1198), brother of Doge Enrico Dandolo
- Andrea Dandolo (admiral) (died 1298), duke of Candia
- Andrea Dandolo (1405–1465), provveditore of the Morea
- Andrea Dandolo (1532–1569), vicebailo in Constantinople
