= Andrea Szilasi =

Canadian photographer

- Born: 1964 (age 61–62)
- Website: andreaszilasi.com

Andrea Szilasi (born 1964) is a Canadian photographer who imaginatively exploits its nature using assemblage.

Her work is included in the collections of the Musée national des beaux-arts du Québec, the Musée d'art contemporain de Montréal and the National Gallery of Canada
