= Andrea Benetti (artist) =

Italian painter, photographer and draftsman

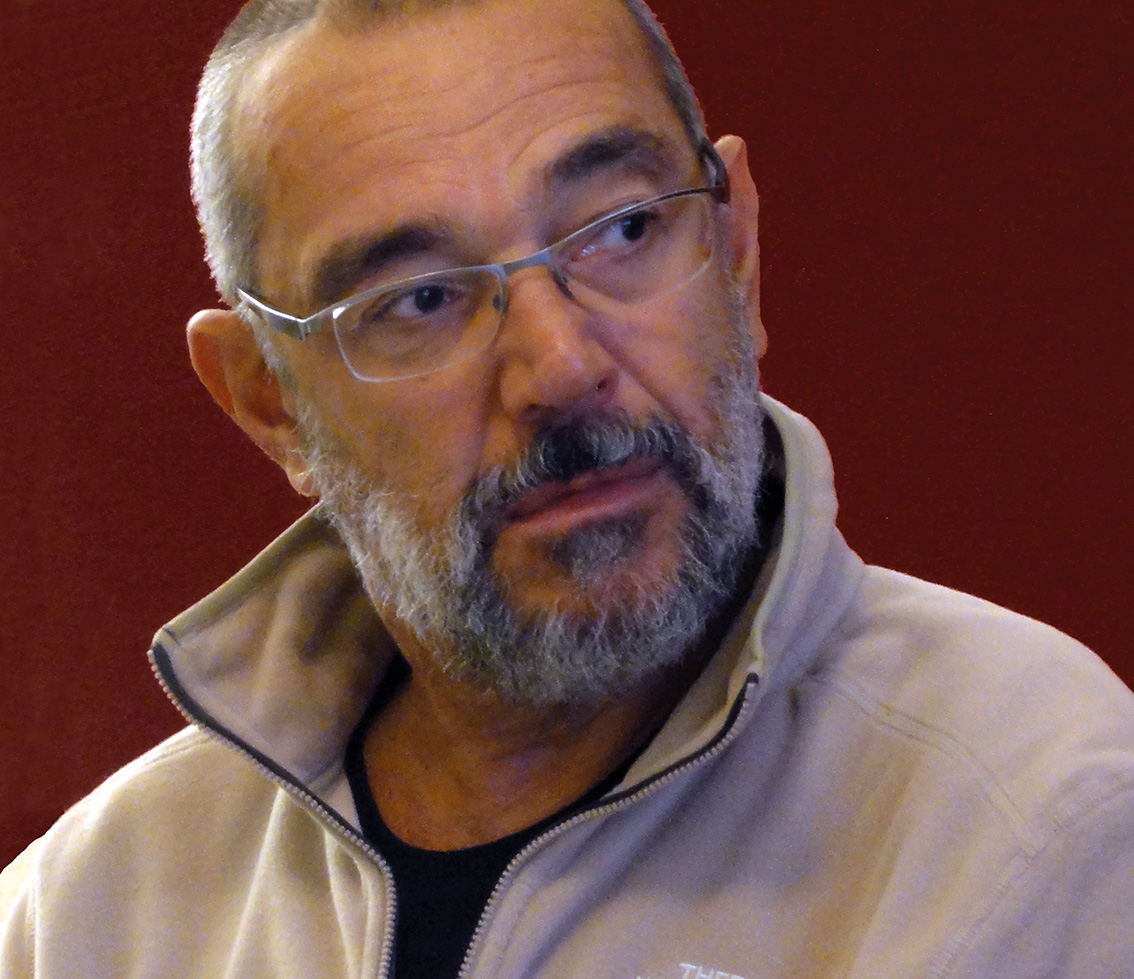
- Born: 15 January 1964 (age 62); Bologna, Italy
- Education: Artistic High School; Academy of Fine Arts; Bologna
- Known for: Visual artist
- Movement: Neo Cave Art
- Awards: LXI Michetti Prize – 2010 International Excellence Prize – 2014 49th Nettuno d'Oro Prize – 2020
- Website: andreabenetti.eu

Andrea Benetti (born 15 January 1964) is an Italian painter, the author of the Manifesto of Neo Cave Art presented in 2009, at the 53rd Venice Biennale, at the Ca' Foscari University.

== Biography ==
Andrea Benetti is an Italian painter, photographer and designer, born in Bologna in 1964. In 2006 he authored the Manifesto of Neo-Cave Art, which he presented at the 53rd Venice Biennale of Art in 2009.
His art is inspired by a direct reference and indirectly to the first forms of art made by prehistoric man. From the cave works, Benetti borrowed their stylistic features from a creative point of view, creating works crowded with stylized zoomorphic and anthropomorphic motifs, geometric shapes and abstract shapes, with fields of color, as if to create an ethical and philosophical bridge between prehistory and contemporaneity, emphasized by 'use of vegetable pigments and techniques such as bas-relief and graffiti.
His work is present in the main national and foreign art collections (such as those of the United Nations, the Vatican and the Quirinale), among his most recent exhibitions are "Colors and sounds of the origins" (Bologna, Palazzo D'Accursio, 2013), "VR60768 · anthropomorphic figure" (Rome, Chamber of Deputies, 2015), "Pater Luminum" (Gallipoli, Civic Museum, 2017) and "Faces against violence" (Bologna, Palazzo D'Accursio, 2017). His work is also represented by online galley like Singulart and, selected in curated collections.
In 2020 the artist was awarded the "Nettuno Prize" of the city of Bologna.

== Museums and collections ==
Private and institutional museums and art collections, which have acquired the works of Andrea Benetti

- United Nations Art Collection (New York City, United States)
  The work is: "Against violence", 2007, cm 14 x 19, oil and acrylic on canvas
- Vatican Art Collection (Città del Vaticano)
  The work is: "Omaggio a Karol Wojtyla", 2009, cm 70 x 50, oil, cacao and acrylic on canvas
- MACIA – Italian Contemporary Art Museum In America (San José – Costa Rica)
  The work is: "Giochi d'infanzia", 2008, cm 60 x 40, oil and karkadè on canvas
- Quirinal Art Collection ∙ Italian Presidency Of The Republic ∙ (Rome – Italy)
  The work is: "Caccia VII", 2010, cm 50 x 100, oil, henna and acrylic on canvas
- Palazzo Montecitorio ∙ Italian Parliament ∙ Chamber Of Deputie (Rome – Italy)
  The work is: "9 novembre 1989", 2009, cm 60 x 80, oil and karkadè on canvas
- University of Ferrara Art Collection (Ferrara – Italy)
  The work is: "Ominide di Porto Badisco I", 2016, cm 50 x 50, palaeolithic sediment and oxides on canvas
- University of Bari Art Collection (Bari – Italy)
  The work is: "Imbarcazione con alberi", 2012, cm 50 x 60, oil, cacao and pigments on canvas
- Mambo ∙ Museum Of Modern Art Bologna (Bologna – Italy)
  The work is: "Fior di Loto", 2008, cm 60 x 60, oil and karkadè on canvas
- Museion ∙ Museum of Modern And Contemporary Art Bolzano (Bolzano – Italy)
  The work is: "Istinto primitivo II", 2009, cm 40 x 30, oil, henna, cacao and acrylic on canvas
- CAMeC – Camec ∙ Center of Modern and Contemporary Art – (La Spezia – Italy)
  The work is: "Grotta dei Cervi", 2015, cm 50 x 50, palaeolithic sediment and oxides on canvas
- F. P. Michetti Museum (Francavilla al Mare – Italy)
  The work is: "Le 3 tesi", 2009, cm 50 x 60, oil, henna and acrylic on canvas
- Osvaldo Licini Contemporary Art Museum (Ascoli Piceno – Italy)
  The work is: "Ominidi e animali I", 2013, cm 80 x 60, travertine, acrylic and plaster on canvas
- Municipality of Lecce Art Collection (Lecce – Italy)
  The work is: "La coerenza", 2009, cm 50 x 70, oil, henna and acrylic on canvas

== Exhibitions ==
In 2026 displayed at PY43, Órigo, Materia tempore subsidit / Art Gallery Il Cesello - Via Stagio Stagi, 64 - Pietrasanta (LU), Italy and Sulla soglia del tempo / Atelier Casalecchio di Infissi Group Bologna - Bologna, Italy

== Bibliography ==
- K. H. Keller, G. Rossi, R. Sabatelli: Andrea Benetti and Lanfranco Di Rico – September 2001, Johns Hopkins University, Bologna, 2008, 12 pages
- Various authors: Arte e cultura – Un ponte tra Italia e Costa Rica, I.I.L.A., San Josè, 2008, 98 pages
- Various authors: Natura e sogni – Catalogo del Padiglione della 53. Biennale di Venezia, Umberto Allemandi & C., Venice, 2009, 98 pages
- Various authors: Esplorazione inconsueta all'interno della velocità, Bologna, 2009, 104 pages
- Andrea Benetti, Gregorio Rossi: Il Manifesto dell'Arte Neorupestre, Umberto Allemandi & C., Venice, 2009, 18 pages
- Carlo Fabrizio Carli: Diorama Italiano – 61º Premio Michetti, Vallecchi, Francavilla a Mare, 2010, 202 pages
- C. Parisot, P. Pensosi: Portraits d'Artistes, Edizioni Casa Modigliani, Roma, 2010, 72 pages
- Simona Gavioli: Andrea Benetti – B. P. Before Present, Media Brain, Bologna, 2009, 52 pages
- Various authors: Andrea Benetti – La pittura Neorupestre, Comune di Castellana Grotte, Castellana Grotte, 2011, 58 pages
- D. Iacuaniello, C. Parisot, G. Rossi: M173 – Tracce apocrife, Istituto Europeo Pegaso, Rome, 2012, 70 pages
- G. Rossi, D. Scarfì: Il simbolismo nella pittura Neorupestre, Mediabrain, Syracuse, 2012, 88 pages
- Andrea Benetti, Silvia Grandi: Colori e suoni delle origini, Qudulibri, Bologna, 2013, 86 pages
- Andrea Benetti, Stefano Papetti: Dalla roccia alla tela – Il travertino nella pittura Neorupestre, Qudulibri, Ascoli P., 2014, 54 pages
- A. Benetti, S. Cassano, D. Coppola, A. F. Uricchio: Colori e suoni delle Origini, Qudulibri, Bari, 2014, 58 pages
- Andrea Benetti, Silvia Grandi: Il colore della luce, Qudulibri, Bologna, 2014, 56 pages
- A. Benetti, S. Grandi, M. Peresani, M. Romandini, G. Virelli: VR60768 – anthropomorphic figure, Qudulibri, Rome, 2015, 80 pages
- Andrea Benetti, Toti Carpentieri: Astrattismo delle origini, Qudulibri, Lecce, 2015, 60 pages
- Various authors: Arte Neorupestre, Monograph, Qudulibri, Bologna, 2015, 208 pages
- Andrea Benetti, Fiorenzo Facchini, Fernando Lanzi, Gioia Lanzi: Signum Crucis, Qudulibri, Bologna, 2016, 42 pages
- A. Benetti – P. Fameli – A. Fiorillo – F. Fontana – M. Peresani – M. Romandini – I. Schipani – U. T. Hohenstein: "preHISTORIA CONTEMPORANEA" Qudulibri, Ferrara, 2016, 64 pages
- A. Benetti – P. Fameli – A. Marrone – M. Ratti: "Omaggio alla pittura Rupestre", Qudulibri, La Spezia, 2016, 58 pages
- Andrea Benetti – Silvia Grandi: "Volti contro la violenza", Qudulibri, Bologna, 2017, 40 pages
