= Small Five Group =

The Small Five Group or S-5 is a group of five small member states of the United Nations that works to improve the working methods of the Security Council. Its main goal is to increase transparency, accountability, and access for non-members.

== Members ==
The S-5 Group is composed of five small states:

- Costa Rica
- Jordan
- Liechtenstein
- Singapore
- Switzerland

== Background ==
Since the early 1990s, the working methods of the Security Council have been a source of concern to the wider membership of the United Nations. With an increase in conflicts after the collapse of the Soviet Union, the workload of the Council increased: In 1988, the Council adopted 20 resolutions, while in 1993 it adopted 93. As the world's principal actor to promote and maintain international peace and security and the principal organ of the United Nations, the Council moved to the center of attention with scathing criticism and doubts about its effectiveness. With the increase in workload and the rising attention of the international media, many meetings took place in a private, closed manner.

The wider UN membership started to become more vocal about the Council's practices and procedures, being particularly disturbed about transparency, participation, accountability, and efficiency.

== History ==
Encouraged by the recommendations of the World Summit Outcome five small member states of the United Nations, later known as the S-5 Group, began to work together in late 2005, with a view to improve the Security Council's working methods. Their main objective was to increase the involvement of States that are not members of the Security Council in its work, enhance its accountability to the rest of the UN, and increase the transparency of its work.

In March 2006, the S-5 Group circulated a draft resolution with the following major proposals:

- Improvement of the relationship between the General Assembly and the Security Council
- Regular and timely consultations between members and non-members
- Informal, interactive discussions of the annual report of the Security Council with the members of the General Assembly
- Restrictions on the veto in cases of genocides, crimes against humanity, and serious violations of international humanitarian law
- Better interaction between the Council and troop contributors
- Better and more effective integration of new members of the Council

For strategic reasons, the resolution was never put to a vote. However, in 2006, the Security Council adopted Presidential note S/2006/507, which was in large part inspired by the appeals of the S-5 Group and contained a number of measures aimed at improving the working methods of the Council. Nevertheless, the note did not become part of the standard operating procedure of the Security Council.

== See also ==
- Forum of Small States
- ASEAN
- Group of 77
- Least developed countries
- Pacific Islands Forum
- Small Island Developing States
- Southeast Asia Treaty Organisation
