= United Nations Security Council =

United Nations organ for international peace and security

United Nations Security Council; Arabic: مجلس الأمن للأمم المتحدة; Chinese: 联合国安全理事会; French: Conseil de sécurité des Nations unies; Russian: Совет Безопасности Организации Объединённых Наций; Spanish: Consejo de Seguridad de las Naciones Unidas

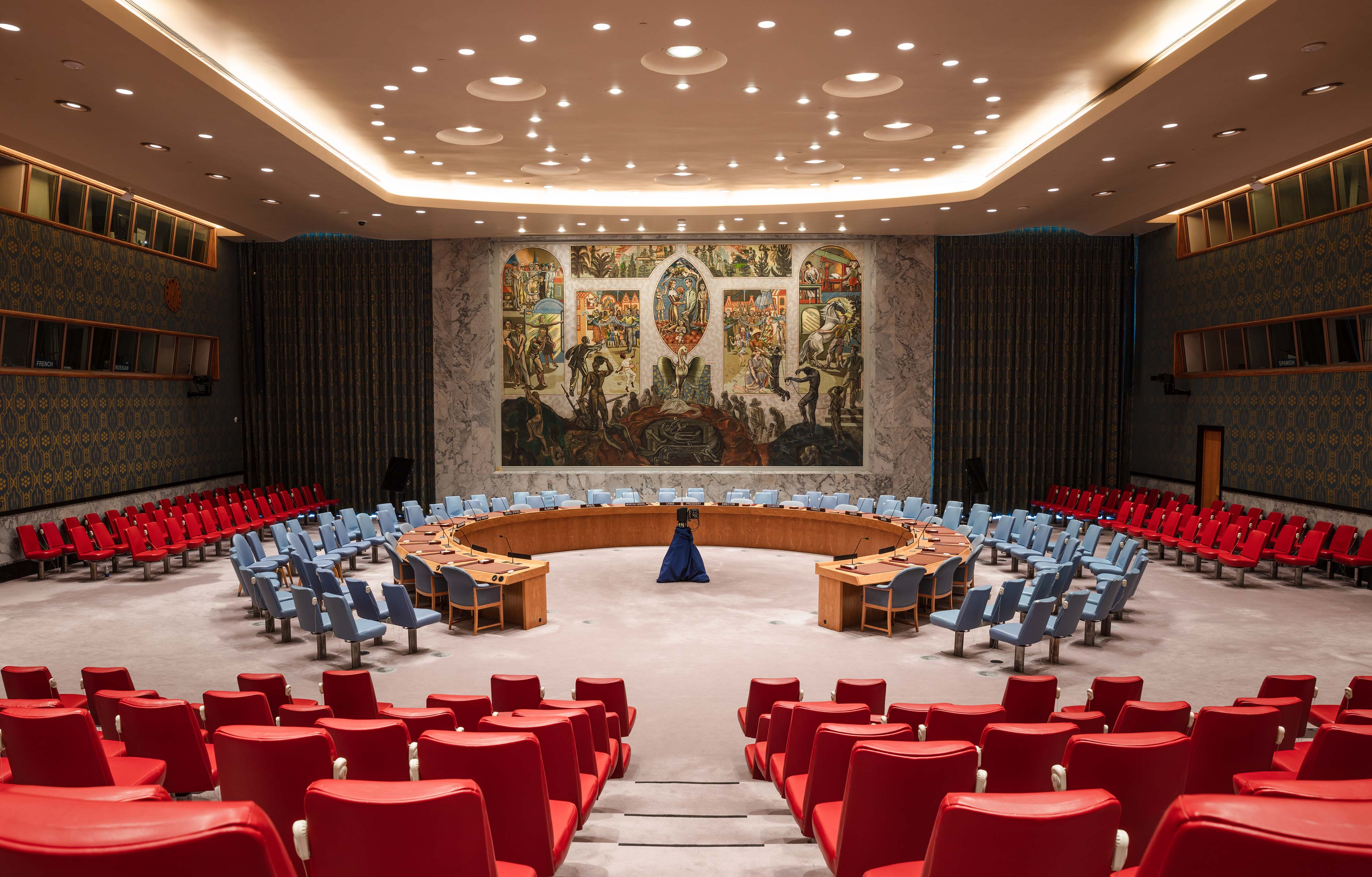
- UN Security Council Chamber in New York
- Abbreviation: UNSC
- Formation: 24 October 1945
- Type: Principal organ
- Headquarters: New York City, U.S.
- Members: Permanent members: China (Note: The People's Republic of China was admitted to the UN and the Security Council in 1971, replacing the Republic of China. The Charter of the United Nations still lists the Republic of China as the member.); France; Russia (Note: The Russian Federation succeeded the seat of the Soviet Union, see Russia and the United Nations. The Charter of the United Nations still lists the Soviet Union as the member.); United Kingdom; United States; Non-permanent members on rotation: Bahrain; Colombia; DR Congo; Denmark; Greece; Latvia; Liberia; Pakistan; Panama; Somalia
- Presidency: Rotates monthly among members
- Parent organization: United Nations
- Website: main.un.org/securitycouncil/
- African States (3) Asia-Pacific States (3) Eastern European States (2) Latin American and Caribbean States (2) Western European and Other States (5)

The United Nations Security Council is one of the six principal organs of the United Nations, and is the United Nations' executive branch, having primary responsibility for the maintenance of international peace and security. Its powers, outlined in the UN Charter, include establishing peacekeeping operations, authorizing military action, and imposing international sanctions. Under Chapter VII of the UN Charter, the council may identify threats to international peace, determine breaches of that peace, and authorize responses up to and including the use of force. It is the only UN body with the authority to adopt binding international law by issuing resolutions binding on all member states. The council also recommends the admission of new member states to the UN General Assembly, and approves changes to the Charter. It is led by the president of the Security Council, who chairs its meetings and rotates between the current members on a monthly basis and the United Nations secretary-general who acts as its executive officer overseeing the implementation of its decisions and mandates. The United Nations secretary-general is empowered by the UN Charter to "bring to the attention of the Security Council any matter which in his opinion may threaten the maintenance of international peace and security".

The Security Council consists of 15 members: five permanent members – Russia, China, the United States, the United Kingdom, and France – and ten non-permanent members elected by the General Assembly for two-year terms. The five permanent members, who were the great powers among the Allies of World War II or their recognized successor states, each hold veto power over substantive resolutions, enabling any one of them to block adoption of a draft resolution regardless of the level of support among other members. This veto right does not carry over into General Assembly matters or votes, which are non-binding. The presidency rotates monthly among all fifteen members in English alphabetical order.

Created in 1945 after World War II to succeed the League of Nations in maintaining international order, the council held its first session on 17 January 1946 at Church House, Westminster, in London. During the Cold War, it was largely paralyzed by rivalry between the United States and the Soviet Union, though it authorized interventions in the Korean War and the Congo Crisis and deployed peacekeepers to Cyprus and the Sinai Peninsula. Following the dissolution of the Soviet Union in 1991, peacekeeping expanded dramatically: the council authorized major operations in Kuwait, Namibia, Cambodia, Bosnia, and Somalia, among others. In the 2020s, the council has faced renewed paralysis, with repeated vetoes by Russia over the war in Ukraine and by the United States over the war in Gaza, prompting fresh calls for structural reform.

Resolutions of the Security Council are enforced in part through UN peacekeeping missions, comprising military, police, and civilian personnel voluntarily provided by member states. As of December 2024, there were 11 active peacekeeping missions with approximately 70,000 personnel from over 120 contributing countries, funded through an approved annual budget of approximately US$5.6 billion.

== History ==
=== Background and creation ===
In the century prior to the United Nations' creation, several international treaty organisations and conferences had been formed to regulate conflicts between nations, such as the International Committee of the Red Cross and the Hague Conventions of 1899 and 1907. Following the catastrophic loss of life in World War I, the Paris Peace Conference established the League of Nations to maintain harmony between nations. The League successfully resolved some territorial disputes and created international structures for postal mail, aviation, and opium control, some of which were later absorbed into the UN. However, it lacked representation for colonial peoples – then half the world's population – and significant participation from several major powers, including the United States, the USSR, Germany, and Japan. It failed to act against the 1931 Japanese invasion of Manchuria, the Second Italo-Ethiopian War in 1935, the 1937 Japanese occupation of China, and Nazi expansions under Adolf Hitler that escalated into World War II.

Chiang Kai-shek, Franklin D. Roosevelt, and Winston Churchill at the Cairo Conference in 1943

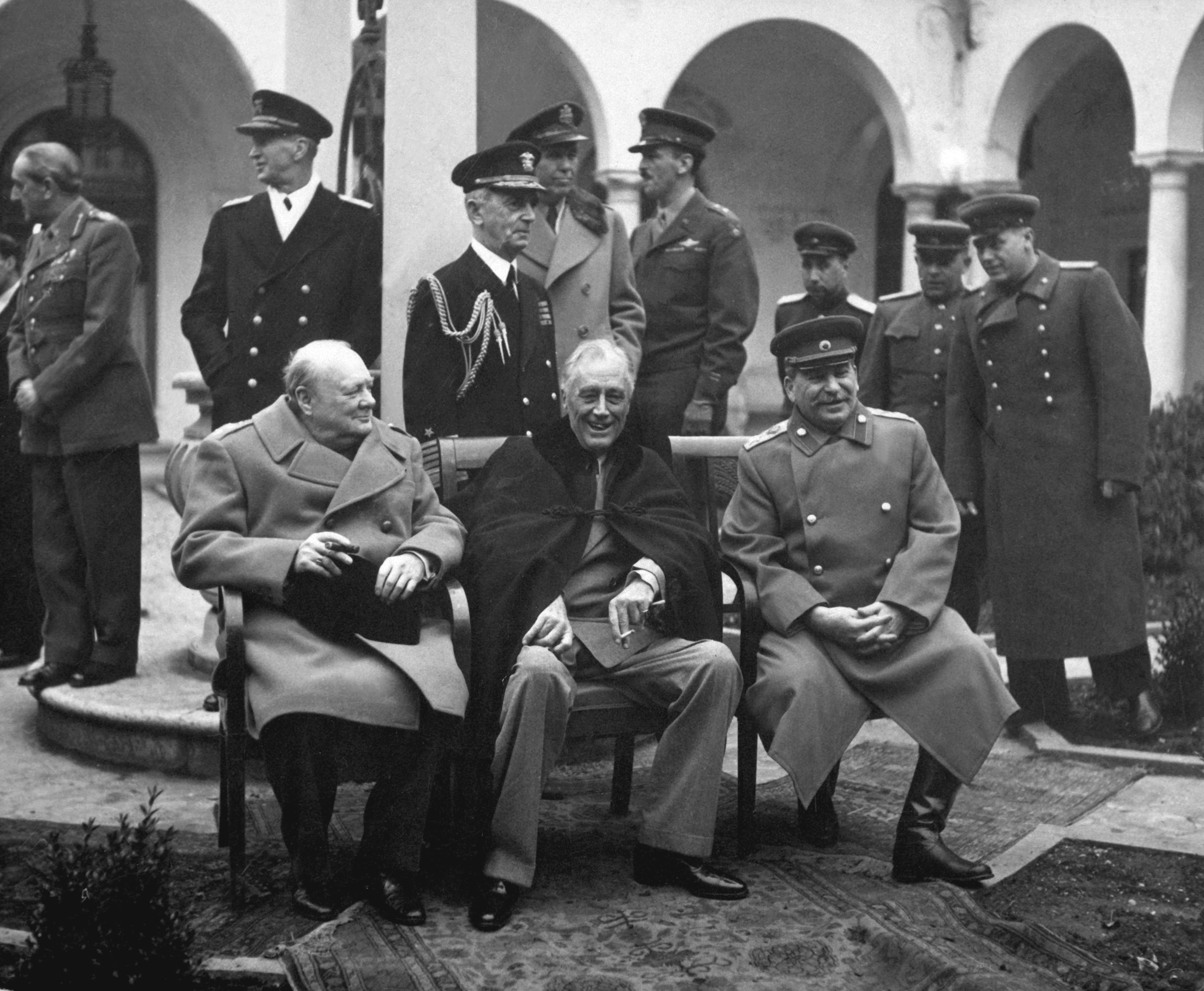
Winston Churchill, Franklin D. Roosevelt, and Joseph Stalin at the Yalta Conference, February 1945

On New Year's Day 1942, President Franklin D. Roosevelt, Prime Minister Winston Churchill, Maxim Litvinov of the USSR, and T. V. Soong of the Republic of China signed a short document based on the Atlantic Charter and the London Declaration. The next day, representatives of 22 other nations added their signatures, and the document came to be known as the United Nations Declaration. By 1 March 1945, 21 additional states had signed. The four major Allied countries – the United States, the United Kingdom, the Soviet Union, and the Republic of China – were styled the "Four Powers" and became the foundation of the Security Council's executive structure.

Following the 1943 Moscow Conference and Tehran Conference, delegations from the Big Four met in mid-1944 at the Dumbarton Oaks Conference in Washington, D.C., to negotiate the UN's structure. The composition of the Security Council quickly became the dominant issue. France, the Republic of China, the Soviet Union, the United Kingdom, and the United States were selected as permanent members; the United States attempted to add Brazil as a sixth member but was opposed by the Soviet and British delegations. The most contentious question at Dumbarton Oaks and in successive talks was the veto rights of permanent members. The Soviet delegation argued that each permanent member should have an absolute veto that could block matters from even being discussed, whilst the British argued that nations should not be able to veto resolutions on disputes to which they were a party. At the Yalta Conference of February 1945, the US, UK, and Russian delegations agreed that each of the Big Five could veto any action by the council, but not procedural resolutions.

On 25 April 1945, the UN Conference on International Organization began in San Francisco, attended by 50 governments and a number of non-governmental organizations involved in drafting the United Nations Charter. At the conference, H. V. Evatt of the Australian delegation pushed to further restrict the veto power of permanent members, but his proposal was defeated twenty votes to ten, owing to fears that rejecting the strong veto would cause the conference to fail.

The UN officially came into existence on 24 October 1945 upon ratification of the UN Charter by the five permanent members and a majority of the other 46 signatories. The Security Council met for the first time on 17 January 1946 at Church House, Westminster, in London. During the 1946–1951 period, it conducted sessions at the United Nations' interim headquarters in Lake Success, New York, which were televised live on CBS by the journalist Edmund Chester in 1949.

=== Cold War ===
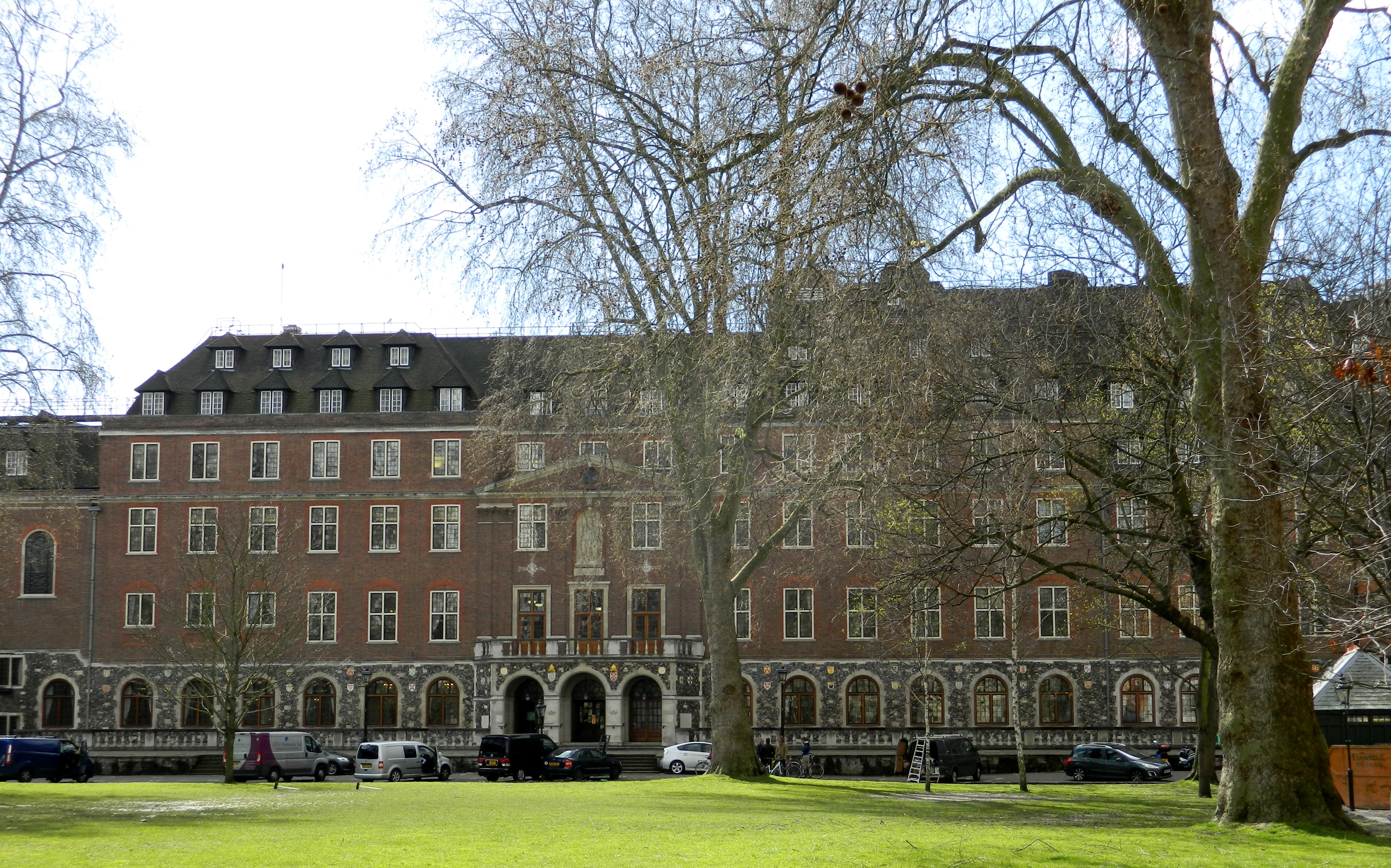
Church House in London, where the first Security Council meeting took place on 17 January 1946

The Security Council was largely paralyzed in its early decades by the Cold War between the United States and the Soviet Union, and their respective allies; the council was generally able to intervene only in conflicts unrelated to the superpower rivalry. A notable exception was the 1950 Security Council resolution authorizing a US-led coalition to repel the North Korean invasion of South Korea, passed during a Soviet boycott of the council. In 1956, the first UN peacekeeping force was established to end the Suez Crisis, but the UN was unable to intervene against the simultaneous Soviet invasion of Hungary. Cold War divisions also paralyzed the Security Council's Military Staff Committee, which had been created by Articles 45–47 of the Charter to oversee UN forces and create UN military bases. The committee continued to exist on paper but largely abandoned its work in the mid-1950s.

In 1960, the UN deployed the UN Operation in the Congo (ONUC) – the largest military force of its early decades – to restore order to the breakaway State of Katanga, returning it to the control of the Democratic Republic of the Congo by 1964. The Security Council found itself bypassed in favour of direct superpower negotiations during some of the decade's larger conflicts, such as the Cuban Missile Crisis and the Vietnam War. It focused instead on smaller conflicts without an immediate Cold War dimension, deploying the UN Temporary Executive Authority in West New Guinea in 1962 and the UN Peacekeeping Force in Cyprus in 1964, the latter of which became one of the UN's longest-running peacekeeping missions.

On 25 October 1971, over US opposition but with the support of many Third World nations, the mainland People's Republic of China replaced the Republic of China in the Security Council seat; the vote was widely seen as a sign of waning US influence in the organization. With an increasing Third World presence and failures of UN mediation in the Middle East, Vietnam, and Kashmir, the UN increasingly shifted its attention toward economic development and cultural exchange. By the 1970s, the UN budget for social and economic development far exceeded its budget for peacekeeping.

=== Post-Cold War ===
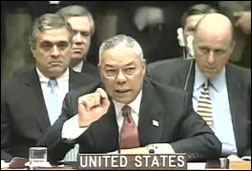
US Secretary of State Colin Powell holds a model vial of anthrax while presenting to the Security Council in February 2003

After the Cold War, the UN saw a radical expansion in its peacekeeping duties, taking on more missions in ten years than it had in the previous four decades. Between 1988 and 2000, the number of adopted Security Council resolutions more than doubled, and the peacekeeping budget increased more than tenfold. The UN negotiated an end to the Salvadoran Civil War, launched a successful peacekeeping mission in Namibia, and oversaw democratic elections in post-apartheid South Africa and post-Khmer Rouge Cambodia. In 1991, the Security Council condemned the Iraqi invasion of Kuwait on the same day of the attack and later authorized a US-led coalition that successfully repulsed the Iraqi forces. Undersecretary-General Brian Urquhart later described the hopes raised by these successes as a "false renaissance" for the organization, given the more troubled missions that followed.

Though the Charter had been written primarily to prevent aggression by one nation against another, in the early 1990s the UN faced a number of simultaneous serious crises within states, including Haiti, Mozambique, and the former Yugoslavia. The UN mission to Bosnia faced "worldwide ridicule" for its indecisive and confused response to ethnic cleansing. In 1994, the UN Assistance Mission for Rwanda failed to intervene in the Rwandan genocide amid Security Council indecision.

In the late 1990s, UN-authorized international interventions took a wider variety of forms. The UN mission during the 1991–2002 Sierra Leone Civil War was supplemented by British Royal Marines, and the UN-authorized 2001 invasion of Afghanistan was overseen by NATO. In 2003, the United States invaded Iraq without a UN Security Council resolution authorizing the use of force, prompting renewed questioning of the council's effectiveness. In the same decade, the Security Council deployed peacekeepers to address the War in Darfur in Sudan and the Kivu conflict in the Democratic Republic of the Congo. In 2013, an internal review of UN actions in the final battles of the Sri Lankan Civil War in 2009 concluded that the organization had suffered "systemic failure".

=== 21st century ===
In 2011, the Security Council authorized a no-fly zone over Libya during the Libyan Civil War, under Resolution 1973, which was adopted with ten votes in favour and five abstentions (Brazil, China, Germany, India, and Russia). Russia and China subsequently argued that the NATO-led intervention exceeded the resolution's mandate, and this experience shaped their approach to later crises: both vetoed multiple draft resolutions on the Syrian civil war from 2011 onward, blocking efforts to impose sanctions or authorize force against the government of Bashar al-Assad.

The Russian invasion of Ukraine in February 2022 precipitated a series of vetoes. Russia vetoed a draft resolution deploring the invasion on 25 February 2022, with eleven members voting in favour and China, India, and the United Arab Emirates abstaining. In September 2022, Russia again vetoed a resolution condemning its attempted annexation of four Ukrainian regions. These vetoes contributed to the adoption of General Assembly Resolution ES-11/1, which deplored the invasion, and prompted the General Assembly to adopt Resolution 76/262 in April 2022, creating a standing mandate for a General Assembly debate whenever a veto is cast in the Security Council.

The Gaza war, which began in October 2023, produced further deadlock. The United States vetoed draft resolutions calling for an immediate humanitarian ceasefire in Gaza in October 2023, December 2023, and February 2024, arguing that they would undercut ongoing diplomatic negotiations. In 2024, seven draft resolutions were vetoed – the highest annual total since 1986 – including four by Russia, three by the United States, and one by China.

== Role ==
The UN's role in international collective security is defined by the UN Charter, which authorizes the Security Council to investigate any situation threatening international peace; recommend procedures for peaceful resolution of a dispute; call upon other member nations to completely or partially interrupt economic relations as well as sea, air, postal and radio communications, or to sever diplomatic relations; and enforce its decisions militarily, or by any means necessary. The council also recommends the new Secretary-General to the General Assembly and recommends new states for admission as member states. The Security Council has traditionally interpreted its mandate as covering military security, though US Ambassador Richard Holbrooke persuaded the body to pass a resolution on HIV/AIDS in Africa in 2000, broadening the definition of threats to peace and security.

=== Chapter VI: Pacific settlement of disputes ===
Under Chapter VI of the Charter, "Pacific Settlement of Disputes", the Security Council "may investigate any dispute, or any situation which might lead to international friction or give rise to a dispute". The council may "recommend appropriate procedures or methods of adjustment" if it determines that the situation might endanger international peace and security. These recommendations are generally considered non-binding, as they lack an enforcement mechanism. A minority of scholars, including Stephen Zunes, have argued that resolutions under Chapter VI are "still directives by the Security Council and differ only in that they do not have the same stringent enforcement options, such as the use of military force".

=== Chapter VII: Threats to peace ===
Chapter VII of the Charter gives the Security Council the power to identify threats to international peace and security, and to authorize responses, including the use of force. Security Council resolutions adopted under Chapter VII, such as economic sanctions, are binding on all UN members. The Security Council is the only UN body with authority to issue binding resolutions.

Under Chapter VII, the Security Council is specifically authorized to respond to "threats to the peace, breaches of the peace, or acts of aggression". In such situations, the Security Council has authority to take "such action by air, sea, or land forces as may be necessary to maintain or restore international peace and security." Thus the Security Council is not limited to recommendations but may take action, including the use of armed force "to maintain or restore international peace and security". This was the legal basis for UN armed action in Korea in 1950 (led by the US under the auspices of the UN Command), the use of coalition forces in Iraq and Kuwait in 1991, and the intervention in Libya in 2011.

=== ICC referrals ===
The Rome Statute of the International Criminal Court (ICC) recognizes that the Security Council has authority to refer cases to the ICC in situations where the court could not otherwise exercise jurisdiction. The council first exercised this power in March 2005, when it referred the situation in Darfur since 1 July 2002 to the court; because Sudan is not a party to the Rome Statute, the court could not otherwise have exercised jurisdiction. The second such referral came in February 2011, when the council asked the ICC to investigate the Libyan government's response to the Libyan Civil War.

=== Responsibility to protect ===
Security Council Resolution 1674, adopted on 28 April 2006, reaffirmed the provisions of the 2005 World Summit Outcome Document regarding the responsibility to protect populations from genocide, war crimes, ethnic cleansing, and crimes against humanity. The Security Council reaffirmed this commitment in Resolution 1706 on 31 August 2006. These resolutions commit the Security Council to taking action to protect civilians in armed conflict, including against genocide, war crimes, ethnic cleansing, and crimes against humanity.

== Members ==
=== Permanent members ===
The five permanent members of the Security Council have the power to veto any substantive resolution, enabling a permanent member to block adoption of a resolution but not to prevent or end debate.

Country	Regional group	Current state representation	Former state representation
China	Asia-Pacific	People's Republic of China	(Taiwan) Republic of China (Note: On 25 October 1971, with opposition from the United States, the People's Republic of China on the mainland was given the Chinese seat on the Security Council in place of the Republic of China on the island of Taiwan. The Charter of the United Nations still lists the Republic of China as the member.) (1945–1949, 1949–1971)
France	Western Europe and Others	(France) French Republic	(France) Provisional Govt. (1945–1946); Fourth Republic (1946–1958)
Russia	Eastern Europe	(Russia) Russian Federation	(Soviet Union) Union of Soviet Socialist Republics (1945–1991)
United Kingdom	Western Europe and Others	United Kingdom of Great Britain and Northern Ireland	—N/a
United States	Western Europe and Others	United States of America	—N/a

At the UN's founding in 1945, the five permanent members were the Republic of China, France (represented by the Provisional Government of the French Republic), the Soviet Union, the United Kingdom, and the United States. There have been two major seat changes since then. China's seat was originally held by Chiang Kai-shek's Nationalist government. After the Nationalists were forced to retreat to Taiwan during the Chinese Civil War in 1949, the Chinese Communist Party assumed control of the mainland as the People's Republic of China. In 1971, General Assembly Resolution 2758 recognized the People's Republic as the rightful representative of China in the UN and transferred the Security Council seat accordingly; the Republic of China was expelled from the UN altogether with no opportunity for membership as a separate nation. After the dissolution of the Soviet Union in 1991, the Russian Federation was recognised as the legal successor state and maintained the Soviet seat.

The five permanent members were the victorious great powers in World War II and have maintained the world's most powerful military forces. They annually top the list of countries with the highest military expenditures. In 2013, they spent over US$1 trillion combined on defence, accounting for over 55% of global military expenditures (the US alone accounting for over 35%). They are also amongst the world's largest arms exporters and are the only nations officially recognized as "nuclear-weapon states" under the Nuclear Non-Proliferation Treaty (NPT), though other states are known or believed to possess nuclear weapons.

The bloc of Western democratic permanent members – France, the United Kingdom, and the United States – is informally styled the "P3".

==== Veto power ====
Under Article 27 of the UN Charter, Security Council decisions on all substantive matters require the affirmative votes of nine members. A negative vote – or "veto" – by a permanent member prevents adoption of a proposal, even if it has received the required number of votes. Abstention is not regarded as a veto in most cases, though all five permanent members must actively concur to adopt any amendment to the Charter. Procedural matters cannot be vetoed, nor can the veto be used to prevent discussion of an issue. The same holds for certain non-binding decisions that directly regard permanent members. Most vetoes have been used for blocking a candidate for Secretary-General or the admission of a member state, not in critical international security situations.

In the negotiations leading to the creation of the UN, the veto power was opposed by many smaller countries and was in effect imposed by the five sponsoring powers, who made clear that the UN would not be founded without it. Francis O. Wilcox, an adviser to the US delegation at the 1945 San Francisco conference, described the situation:

At San Francisco, the issue was made crystal clear by the leaders of the Big Five: it was either the Charter with the veto or no Charter at all. Senator Connally [from the U.S. delegation] dramatically tore up a copy of the Charter during one of his speeches and reminded the small states that they would be guilty of that same act if they opposed the unanimity principle. "You may, if you wish," he said, "go home from this Conference and say that you have defeated the veto. But what will be your answer when you are asked: 'Where is the Charter?'"

An early veto by Soviet commissar Andrei Vyshinsky blocked a resolution on the withdrawal of French forces from Syria and Lebanon in February 1946, establishing the precedent that permanent members could use the veto on matters outside immediate concerns of war and peace. The Soviet Union went on to veto the admission of Austria, Cambodia, Ceylon (now Sri Lanka), Finland, Ireland, Italy, Japan, Laos, Libya, Nepal, Portugal, South Vietnam, and Transjordan as member states, delaying their admission by several years. The United Kingdom and France used the veto to avoid condemnation of their actions in the 1956 Suez Crisis. The first US veto came in 1970, blocking General Assembly action on Southern Rhodesia. From 1985 to 1990, the United States vetoed 27 resolutions, primarily to block resolutions perceived as critical of Israel but also to protect its interests in Panama and Korea. The Soviet Union, the United States, and China have all vetoed candidates for Secretary-General, with the United States blocking the re-election of Boutros Boutros-Ghali in 1996.

Through the end of 2024, Russia and the Soviet Union had cast approximately 120 vetoes, the United States 89, the United Kingdom 29, and France and China 16 each. (Note: These figures exclude vetoes cast to block candidates for Secretary-General, as these occur in closed session.) Roughly two-thirds of Soviet and Russian combined vetoes were in the first ten years of the Security Council's existence.

In April 2022, the General Assembly adopted Resolution 76/262, the "veto initiative", which requires a General Assembly debate within ten working days whenever a Security Council veto is cast, allowing the vetoing member to explain itself and giving all member states an opportunity to respond. The first General Assembly debate under this resolution occurred on 26 April 2023, following Russia's veto of a draft resolution condemning its attempted annexation of Ukrainian territory.

=== Non-permanent members ===
Along with the five permanent members, the Security Council has ten non-permanent members that hold their seats on a rotating basis by geographic region. Non-permanent members may be involved in global security briefings. In its first two decades, the Security Council had six non-permanent members, the first of which were Australia, Brazil, Egypt, Mexico, the Netherlands, and Poland. In 1965, the number of non-permanent members was expanded to ten.

These ten non-permanent members are elected by the United Nations General Assembly for two-year terms starting on 1 January, with five replaced each year. To be approved, a candidate must receive at least two-thirds of all votes cast for that seat, which can result in deadlock if there are two roughly evenly matched candidates. In 1979, a standoff between Cuba and Colombia only ended after three months and a record 154 rounds of voting; both eventually withdrew in favour of Mexico as a compromise candidate. A retiring member is not eligible for immediate re-election.

The African Group is represented by three members; the Latin America and the Caribbean, Asia-Pacific, and Western European and Others groups by two apiece; and the Eastern European Group by one. Traditionally, one of the seats assigned to either the Asia-Pacific Group or the African Group is filled by a nation from the Arab world, alternating between the groups. Currently, elections for terms beginning in even-numbered years select two African members, and one each within Eastern Europe, Asia-Pacific, and Latin America and the Caribbean; the traditional "Arab seat" is elected for this term. Terms beginning in odd-numbered years consist of two Western European and Other members, and one each from Asia-Pacific, Africa, and Latin America and the Caribbean.

During the 2016 United Nations Security Council election, neither Italy nor the Netherlands met the required two-thirds majority for election. They subsequently agreed to split the term of the Western European and Others Group. It was the first time in over five decades that two members agreed to do so. Usually, intractable deadlocks are resolved by the candidate countries withdrawing in favour of a third member state.

The current elected members, with the regions they were elected to represent, are as follows:

On June 3, 2026, the United Nations General Assembly held an election to select five new non-permanent members of the UN Security Council. The countries chosen—Austria, Portugal, Zimbabwe, Kyrgyzstan, and Trinidad and Tobago—will serve two-year terms beginning in 2027. As a result of the election, Zimbabwe is set to replace Somalia, while Trinidad and Tobago will take over the seat currently held by Panama. Portugal and Austria will succeed Denmark and Greece, respectively, and Kyrgyzstan will replace Pakistan.

Term	Africa			Asia-Pacific		Eastern Europe	Latin America and Caribbean		Western Europe and Other	
2025			Somalia		Pakistan			Panama	Denmark	Greece
2026	Liberia	DR Congo	Somalia	Bahrain	Pakistan	Latvia	Colombia	Panama	Denmark	Greece
2027	Liberia	DR Congo	Zimbabwe	Bahrain	Kyrgyzstan	Latvia	Colombia	Trinidad and Tobago	Austria	Portugal
2028			Zimbabwe		Kyrgyzstan			Trinidad and Tobago	Austria	Portugal

=== President ===
The role of president of the Security Council involves setting the agenda, presiding at its meetings and overseeing any crisis. The president is authorized to issue both presidential statements (subject to consensus amongst council members) and notes, which are used to make declarations of intent that the full Security Council can then pursue. The presidency of the council is held by each of the members in turn for one month, following the English alphabetical order of the member states' names. No distinction is made between permanent and non-permanent members in the rotation.

The list of nations that will hold the presidency in 2026 is as follows:

Presidency in 2026
Month	Country
January	Somalia
February	United Kingdom
March	United States
April	Bahrain
May	China
June	Colombia
July	Democratic Republic of the Congo
August	Denmark
September	France
October	Greece
November	Latvia
December	Liberia

=== Penholders ===
In the Security Council, a penholder is a member with informal responsibility for a particular area of concern. Penholders draft resolutions and organize meetings. They are generally drawn from the P5 (permanent members of the Council) or P3 (US, Britain, and France). Penholdership has no formal status. It nevertheless is "accepted, however unwillingly, as 'the way things are done' by Council members".

== Meeting locations ==
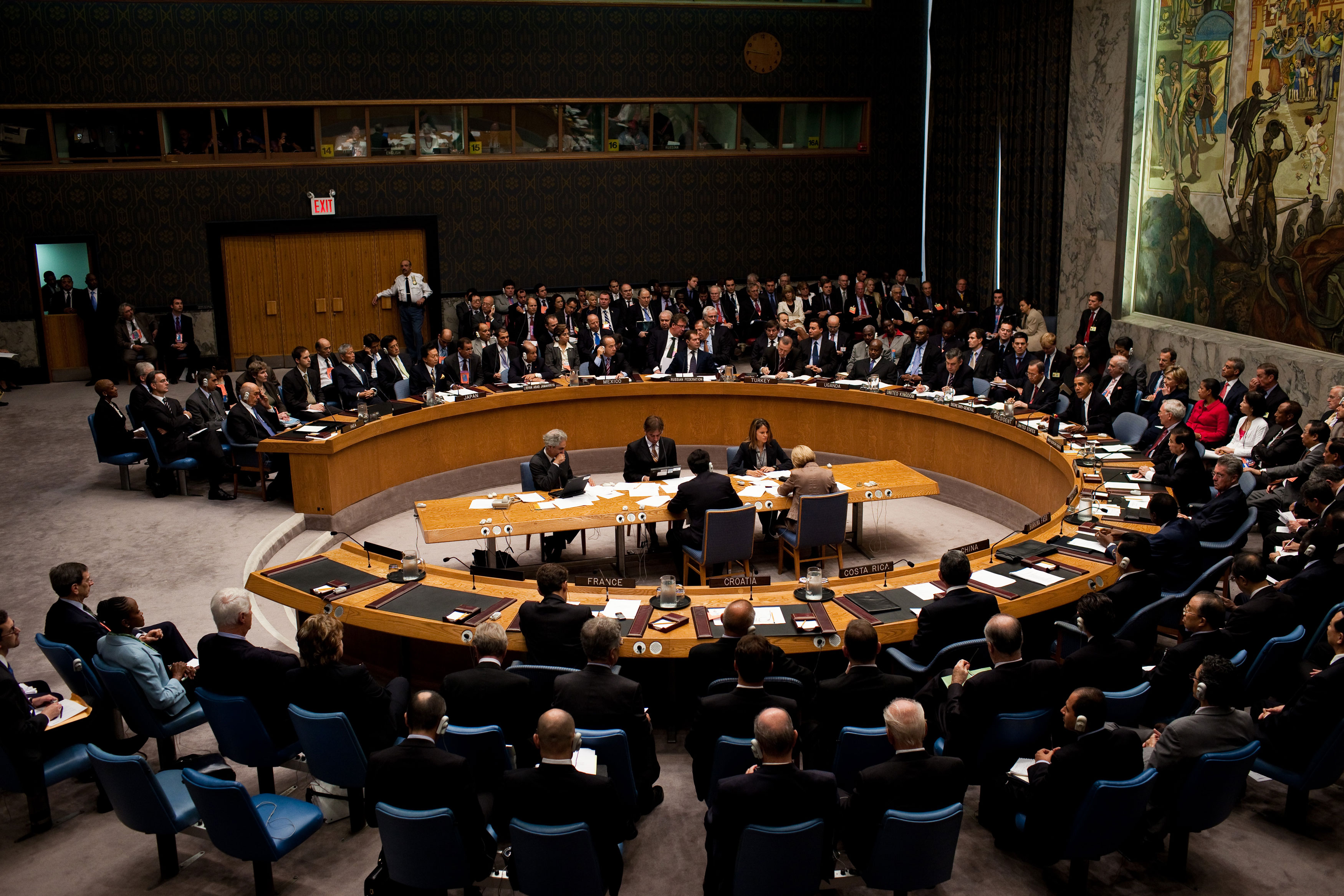
US President Barack Obama chairs a United Nations Security Council meeting.

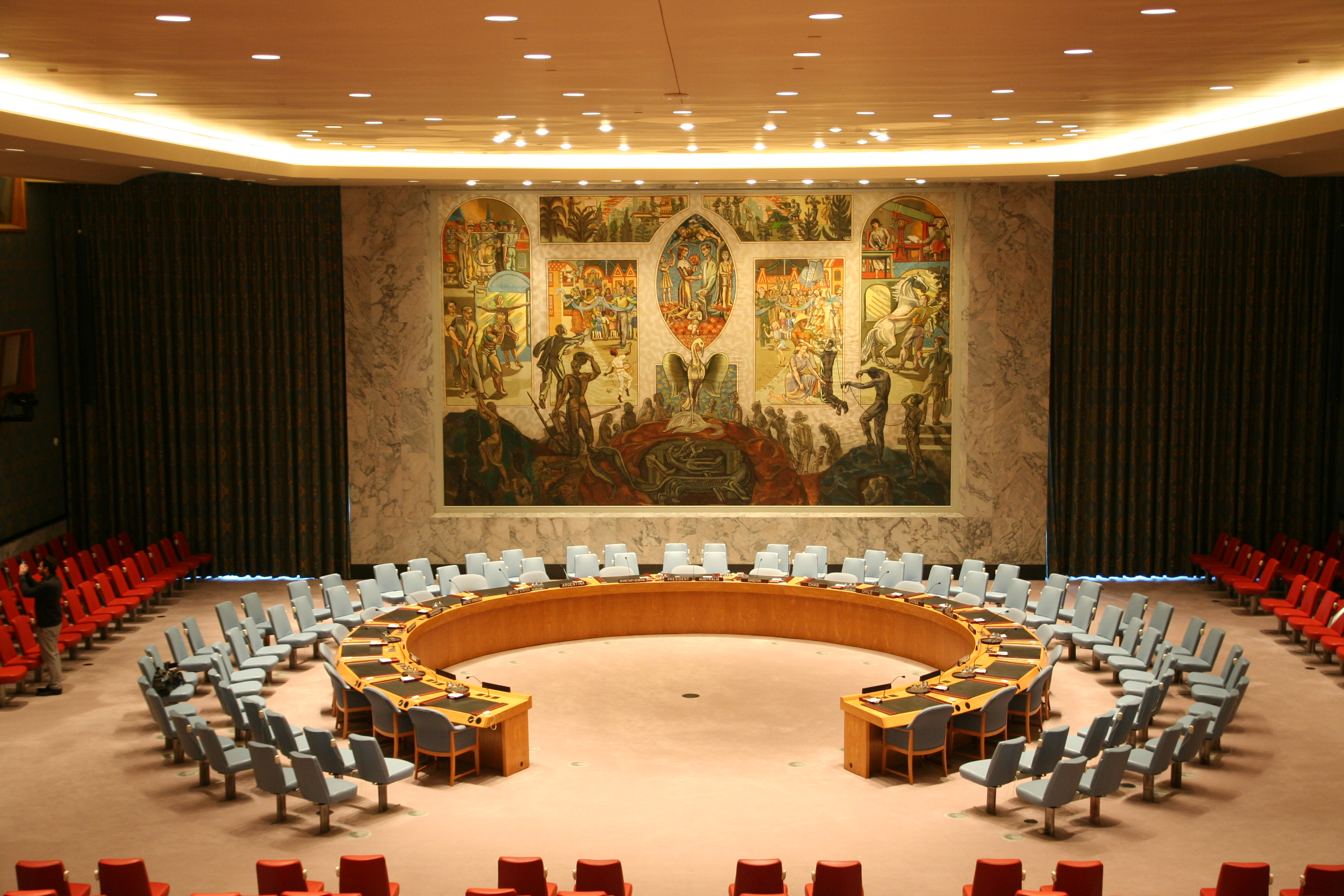
The meeting room exhibits Untitled (Mural for Peace), the United Nations Security Council mural by Per Krohg (1952).

Unlike the General Assembly, the Security Council is not bound to sessions. Each Security Council member must have a representative available at UN Headquarters at all times in case an emergency meeting becomes necessary.

The Security Council generally meets in a designated chamber in the UN Conference Building in New York City. The chamber was designed by the Norwegian architect Arnstein Arneberg and was a gift from Norway. The UN Security Council mural by Norwegian artist Per Krohg (1952) depicts a phoenix rising from its ashes, symbolic of the world's rebirth after World War II.

The Security Council has also held meetings in cities including Nairobi, Kenya; Addis Ababa, Ethiopia; Panama City, Panama; and Geneva, Switzerland. In March 2010, the Security Council moved into a temporary facility in the General Assembly Building as its chamber underwent renovations as part of the UN Capital Master Plan. The renovations were funded by Norway, the chamber's original donor, for a total cost of US$5 million. The chamber reopened on 16 April 2013. The representatives of the member states are seated on a horseshoe-shaped table, with the president in the very middle flanked by the Secretary on the right and the Undersecretary on the left. The other representatives are placed in clockwise order alphabetically from the president leaving two seats at the ends of the table for guest speakers. The seating order of the members is then rotated each month as the presidency changes.

Because of the public nature of meetings in the Security Council Chamber, delegations use the chamber to voice their positions in different ways, such as with walkouts.

=== Consultation room ===
Due to the public scrutiny of the Security Council Chamber, much of the work of the Security Council is conducted behind closed doors in "informal consultations".

In 1978, West Germany funded the construction of a conference room next to the Security Council Chamber. The room was used for "informal consultations", which soon became the primary meeting format for the Security Council. In 1994, the French ambassador complained to the Secretary-General that "informal consultations have become the Council's characteristic working method, whilst public meetings, originally the norm, are increasingly rare and increasingly devoid of content: everyone knows that when the Council goes into public meeting everything has been decided in advance". When Russia funded the renovation of the consultation room in 2013, the Russian ambassador called it "quite simply, the most fascinating place in the entire diplomatic universe".

Only members of the Security Council are permitted in the conference room for consultations. The press is not admitted, and other members of the United Nations cannot be invited into the consultations. No formal record is kept of the informal consultations. As a result, the delegations can negotiate with each other in secret, striking deals and compromises without having their every word transcribed into the permanent record. The privacy of the conference room also makes it possible for the delegates to deal with each other in a friendly manner. In one early consultation, a new delegate from a Communist nation began a propaganda attack on the United States, only to be told by the Soviet delegate, "We don't talk that way in here."

A permanent member can cast a "pocket veto" during the informal consultation by declaring its opposition to a measure. Since a veto would prevent the resolution from being passed, the sponsor will usually refrain from putting the resolution to a vote. Resolutions are vetoed only if the sponsor feels so strongly about a measure that it wishes to force the permanent member to cast a formal veto. By the time a resolution reaches the Security Council Chamber, it has already been discussed, debated and amended in the consultations. The open meeting of the Security Council is merely a public ratification of a decision that has already been reached in private. For example, Resolution 1373 was adopted without public debate in a meeting that lasted just five minutes.

The Security Council holds far more consultations than public meetings. In 2012, the Security Council held 160 consultations, 16 private meetings and 9 public meetings. In times of crisis, the Security Council still meets primarily in consultations, but it also holds more public meetings. After the outbreak of the Russo-Ukrainian War in 2014, the Security Council returned to the patterns of the Cold War, as Russia and the Western countries engaged in verbal duels in front of the television cameras. In 2016, the Security Council held 150 consultations, 19 private meetings and 68 public meetings.

== Subsidiary bodies ==
Article 29 of the Charter provides that the Security Council can establish subsidiary bodies in order to perform its functions. This authority is also reflected in Rule 28 of the Provisional Rules of Procedure. The subsidiary bodies established by the Security Council are heterogeneous, ranging from the Security Council Committee on Admission of New Members to the international criminal tribunals and the numerous sanctions committees established to oversee implementation of various sanctions regimes.

=== Sanctions committees ===
The council has created sanctions committees to oversee the implementation of sanctions regimes imposed on specific countries, entities, or individuals. As of 2024, there were 15 active sanctions regimes, with 685 individuals and 193 entities subject to measures such as asset freezes, travel bans, and arms embargoes. Each sanctions committee typically consists of all fifteen council members and is assisted by a panel or group of experts.

The committees make their decisions by consensus.

=== Counter-Terrorism Committee ===
The Counter-Terrorism Committee (CTC) was established by Security Council Resolution 1373, adopted on 28 September 2001 in response to the 11 September attacks. The CTC works to strengthen the capacity of UN member states to prevent terrorist acts within their borders and across regions. It is assisted by the Counter-Terrorism Committee Executive Directorate (CTED), which carries out the committee's policy decisions and conducts expert assessments of member states' counter-terrorism measures.

=== International tribunals ===
The Security Council established two ad hoc international criminal tribunals under Chapter VII: the International Criminal Tribunal for the former Yugoslavia (ICTY) in 1993 and the International Criminal Tribunal for Rwanda (ICTR) in 1994. Both tribunals completed their mandates and were succeeded by the International Residual Mechanism for Criminal Tribunals, which handles remaining functions including appeals and fugitive tracking.

== United Nations peacekeepers ==
After approval by the Security Council, the UN may send peacekeepers to regions where armed conflict has recently ceased or paused to enforce the terms of peace agreements and to discourage combatants from resuming hostilities. Since the UN does not maintain its own military, peacekeeping forces are voluntarily provided by member states. These soldiers are sometimes nicknamed "Blue Helmets" for their distinctive gear. The peacekeeping force as a whole received the Nobel Peace Prize in 1988.

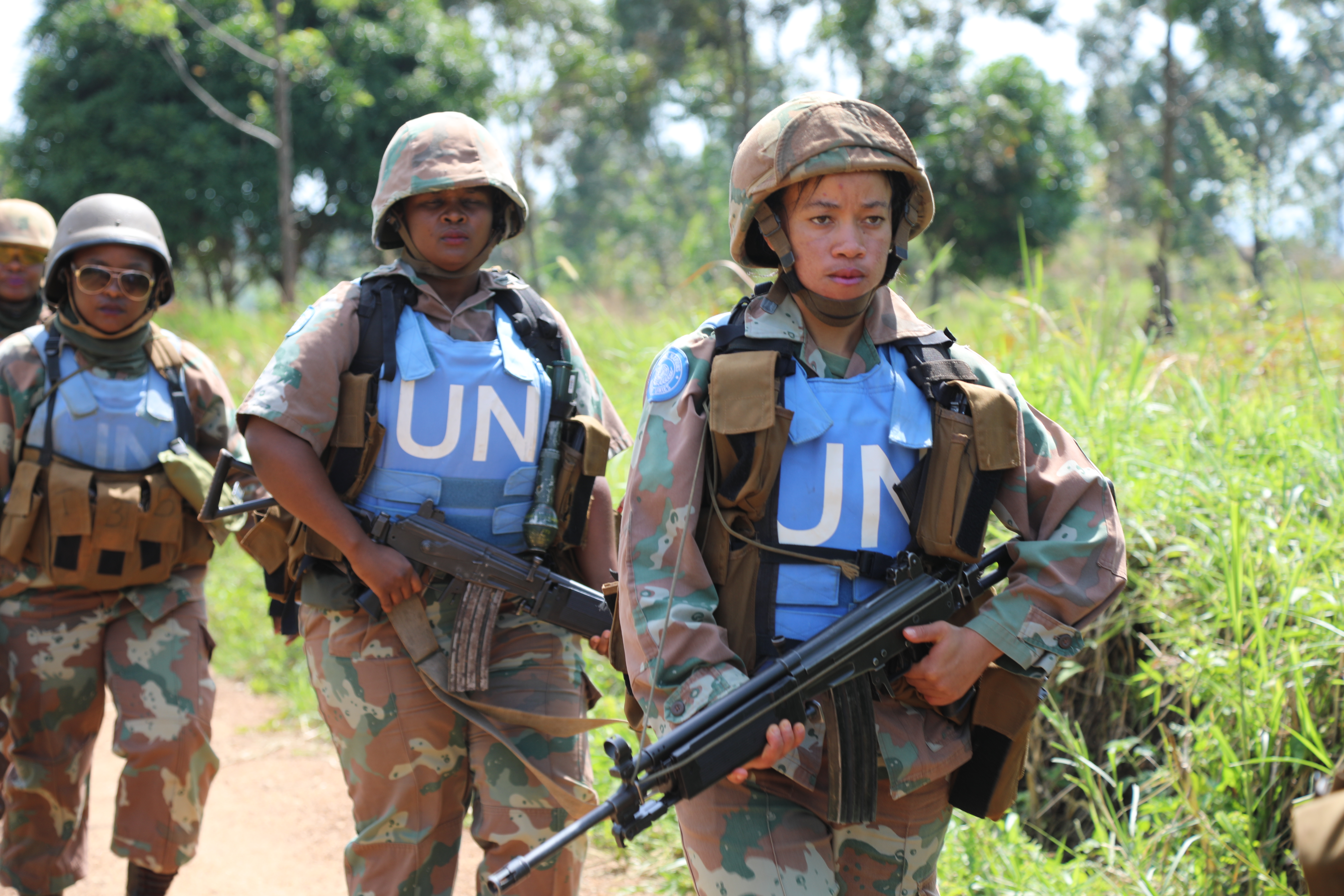
South African soldiers patrolling as part of MONUSCO in 2018

As of December 2024, the UN maintained 11 active peacekeeping operations with approximately 70,000 personnel from over 120 contributing countries. Active missions included those in the Democratic Republic of the Congo (MONUSCO), South Sudan (UNMISS), the Central African Republic (MINUSCA), Lebanon (UNIFIL), Cyprus (UNFICYP), and the Golan Heights (UNDOF). The smallest mission, the United Nations Military Observer Group in India and Pakistan (UNMOGIP), included 42 uniformed personnel responsible for monitoring the ceasefire in Jammu and Kashmir. Peacekeepers with the United Nations Truce Supervision Organization (UNTSO) have been stationed in the Middle East since 1948, the longest-running active peacekeeping mission.

Total UN peacekeeping personnel declined from 161,509 in 2015 to 94,451 in 2024, a reduction of more than 40%, reflecting the closure of several large missions and shifting geopolitical priorities. As of 2024, approximately 74% of UN peacekeepers were deployed in sub-Saharan Africa. The top troop contributors to UN peacekeeping operations are Nepal, Bangladesh, and India, all from the Global South.

UN peacekeepers have also drawn criticism in several postings. Peacekeepers have been accused of child rape, soliciting prostitutes, or sexual abuse during various peacekeeping missions in the Democratic Republic of the Congo, Haiti, Liberia, Sudan and what is now South Sudan, Burundi and Ivory Coast. Scientists cited UN peacekeepers from Nepal as the likely source of the 2010–2013 Haiti cholera outbreak, which killed more than 8,000 Haitians following the 2010 Haiti earthquake.

The budget for peacekeeping is assessed separately from the main UN organizational budget; in the fiscal year 1 July 2023 – 30 June 2024, the approved peacekeeping budget was approximately US$5.6 billion. UN peace operations are funded by assessments, using a formula derived from the regular funding scale, but including a weighted surcharge for the five permanent Security Council members. This surcharge serves to offset discounted peacekeeping assessment rates for less-developed countries.

For the 2020–2021 budget, the top 10 providers of assessed financial contributions to United Nations peacekeeping operations were the US (27.89%), China (15.21%), Japan (8.56%), Germany (6.09%), the United Kingdom (5.79%), France (5.61%), Italy (3.30%), Russian Federation (3.04%), Canada (2.73%) and South Korea (2.26%).

== Criticism and evaluation ==
In examining the first sixty years of the Security Council's existence, British historian Paul Kennedy concludes that "glaring failures had not only accompanied the UN's many achievements, they overshadowed them", identifying as particular failures the lack of will to prevent ethnic massacres in Bosnia and Rwanda. Kennedy attributes the failures to the UN's lack of reliable military resources, writing that "above all, one can conclude that the practice of announcing (through a Security Council resolution) a new peacekeeping mission without ensuring that sufficient armed forces will be available has usually proven to be a recipe for humiliation and disaster."

The veto power has attracted sustained criticism. Detractors argue that it renders the council incapable of acting on the most consequential threats to international peace, particularly when a permanent member is itself a party to a conflict or has close ties to one. The council's inability to prevent or respond effectively to the Rwandan genocide, the Bosnian War, the Syrian civil war, and the wars in Ukraine and Gaza has been cited as evidence of structural dysfunction.

Critics also point to the unrepresentative composition of the permanent membership, which reflects the power structure of 1945. No African, Latin American, or South Asian country holds a permanent seat, despite these regions comprising a large share of the world's population and featuring prominently on the council's agenda. Scholar Sudhir Chella Rajan argued in 2006 that the five permanent members had created an exclusive nuclear club that predominantly addresses the strategic interests and political motives of the permanent members – for example, protecting the oil-rich Kuwaitis in 1991 but poorly protecting the resource-poor Rwandans in 1994. Since three of the five permanent members are European, and four are predominantly white developed nations, the Security Council has been described as a pillar of global apartheid by Titus Alexander, former Chair of the Westminster United Nations Association.

Several studies have examined the Security Council's responsiveness to armed conflict. Findings suggest that the council is more likely to meet and deliberate on conflicts that are more intense and have led to more humanitarian suffering, but that its responsiveness is also shaped by the political interests of member states and in particular of the permanent members.

The Security Council's effectiveness and relevance are questioned because, in most high-profile cases, there are essentially no consequences for violating a Security Council resolution. During the Darfur crisis, Janjaweed militias, allowed by elements of the Sudanese government, committed violence against an indigenous population, killing thousands of civilians. In the Srebrenica massacre, Serbian troops committed genocide against Bosniaks, although Srebrenica had been declared a UN safe area, protected by 400 armed Dutch peacekeepers.

The Security Council has also been criticized for failure in resolving many conflicts – including Cyprus, Sri Lanka, Syria, Kosovo, and the Israeli–Palestinian conflict – reflecting the wider shortcomings of the UN.

A 2005 RAND Corporation study found the UN to be successful in two out of three peacekeeping efforts. It compared UN nation-building efforts to those of the United States, and found that 88% of UN cases had led to lasting peace. Also in 2005, the Human Security Report documented a decline in the number of wars, genocides and human rights abuses since the end of the Cold War, and presented evidence, albeit circumstantial, that international activism – mostly spearheaded by the UN – had been the main cause of the decline in armed conflict since the end of the Cold War.

Supporters counter that the council, for all its limitations, provides a framework within which the great powers can negotiate and that the veto, while frustrating, reflects the reality that enforcement action cannot succeed without the cooperation of the most powerful states. The expansion of peacekeeping operations since 1990 and the development of sanctions regimes and international tribunals are cited as significant achievements.

The UN Charter gives all three powers of the legislative, executive and judiciary branches to the Security Council.

There is evidence of bribery in the Security Council. Countries that are elected to the Security Council see a large increase in foreign aid from the US, averaging 59%. They also see an 8% increase in aid from the UN, mainly from UNICEF. The increase most strongly correlates to years in which the Security Council addresses issues relevant to the US. There is also evidence of increased foreign aid to elected countries from Japan and Germany. One study found membership on the Security Council correlates with reduced economic growth for a given country over the course of its two-year term – 3.5% growth during membership compared to 8.7% over four years of non-membership – although the effect is mainly driven by African authoritarian countries. Elected members also experience a reduction in democracy and freedom of the press.

== Reform ==
The G4 nations: Brazil, Germany, India, Japan

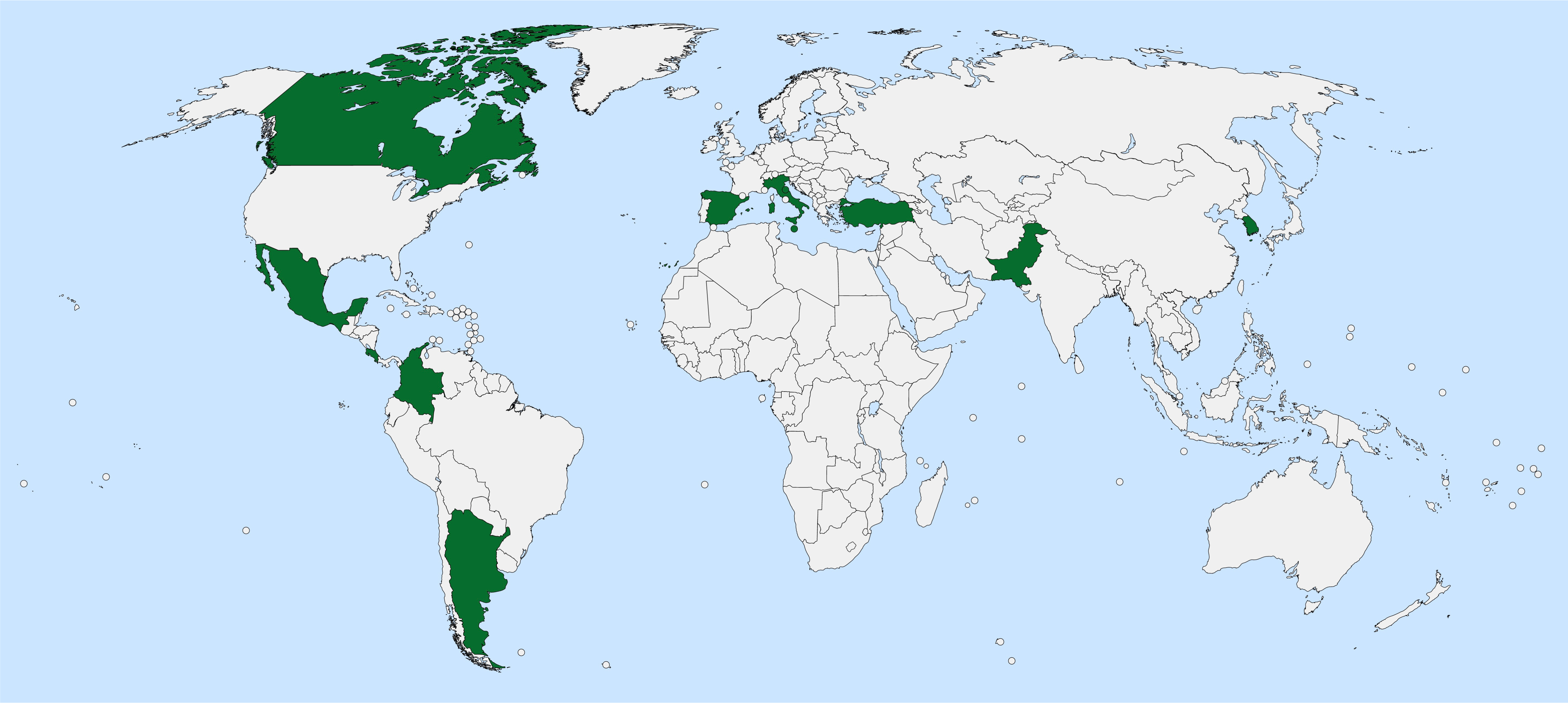
The Uniting for Consensus: Italy, Pakistan, Spain, Canada, Mexico, Argentina, Turkey, South Korea and others

Proposals to reform the Security Council began with the conference that wrote the UN Charter and have continued to the present day. As British historian Paul Kennedy writes, "Everyone agrees that the present structure is flawed. But consensus on how to fix it remains out of reach." The council's membership has been expanded only once, in 1965, when the number of non-permanent members was increased from six to ten. Proposals for further reform have faced resistance from the permanent members, each of whom holds a veto over any Charter amendment.

=== G4 proposal ===
The G4 nations (Brazil, Germany, India, and Japan) have campaigned for permanent seats on the Security Council, arguing that the body's composition reflects the geopolitical realities of 1945 rather than the contemporary world. Their core proposal calls for expanding the council from 15 to 25 or 26 members, with six new permanent seats: two for Africa, two for the Asia-Pacific, one for Latin America and the Caribbean, and one for Western Europe and Others. Per the G4 proposal, the new permanent members would not immediately gain veto power; instead, that matter would be reviewed after a transitionary period of 10 to 15 years. Japan and Germany had been the UN's second- and third-largest funders, respectively, before China took over as the second-largest funder in recent years, whilst Brazil and India are two of the largest contributors of troops to UN-mandated peacekeeping missions.

In 2017, the G4 nations indicated willingness temporarily to forgo veto power if granted permanent seats.

The permanent members have announced their positions on Security Council reform reluctantly. The United States has supported the permanent membership of Japan and lent its support to India and a small number of additional non-permanent members. The United Kingdom and France have essentially supported the G4 position, with the expansion of permanent and non-permanent members and the accession of Germany, Brazil, India, and Japan to permanent member status, as well as an increase in the presence of African countries on the council. China has supported stronger representation of developing countries and has firmly opposed Japan's membership.

=== African Union proposal ===
The African Union has called for at least two permanent seats with full veto power and two additional non-permanent seats for African states, as outlined in the Ezulwini Consensus of 2005. Africa's position emphasizes the need to redress what it terms the "historic injustice" of having no permanent representation on the council, despite African issues constituting a substantial portion of the council's agenda.

=== Uniting for Consensus ===
The Uniting for Consensus group, generally led by Italy and including countries such as Spain, Mexico, Colombia, Argentina, Pakistan, South Korea, Turkey, and Indonesia, opposes the creation of new permanent seats, arguing this would expand an existing oligarchy. The group instead proposes longer-term elected seats with the possibility of re-election, thereby providing more equitable regional representation without entrenching additional permanent privileges. As far as traditional categories of seats are concerned, the UfC proposal does not imply any change, but only the introduction of small and medium-sized states amongst groups eligible for regular seats. This proposal includes the question of veto, giving a range of options from abolition to limitation of the application of the veto to Chapter VII matters only.

=== Veto restraint proposals ===
In April 2023, France called for the five permanent members to collectively suspend the use of the veto in cases of mass atrocities, echoing earlier proposals for veto restraint in situations involving genocide, crimes against humanity, and war crimes. The proposal has not been formally adopted by the other permanent members.

=== Pact for the Future (2024) ===
At the Summit of the Future in September 2024, world leaders adopted the Pact for the Future, which contained the most concrete commitment to Security Council reform since the 1960s. The Pact called for the council to be made "more representative, inclusive, transparent, efficient, democratic and accountable" and affirmed that any enlargement should "redress the historic injustice against Africa" and other underrepresented regions. It empowered the co-chairs of the intergovernmental negotiations to draft a consolidated model for council enlargement based on the various proposals put forward by member states, and called for agreement on categories of membership and on the future scope and limits of the veto.

In 2025, at the 17th BRICS summit in Rio de Janeiro, Brazil's outgoing BRICS president, President Luiz Inácio Lula da Silva, and India's prime minister Narendra Modi emphasized their shared ambition to secure permanent membership on the UNSC. Modi highlighted the need for reforming the UNSC to enhance its credibility and effectiveness by better representing the Global South, noting that many key economies remain excluded from decision-making. Both leaders affirmed that reforming the UNSC would be a priority for India during its upcoming BRICS presidency in 2026.

== See also ==
- United Nations Security Council resolution
- List of United Nations Security Council resolutions
- United Nations Security Council veto power
- Permanent members of the United Nations Security Council
- Reform of the United Nations Security Council
- Presidency of the United Nations Security Council
- United Nations peacekeeping
- United Nations General Assembly
- Charter of the United Nations
- Use of force
- Use of force in international law
- United Nations Command
- Law of war (international humanitarian law)
- Reform of the United Nations
- Small Five Group, a group formed to improve the working methods of the Security Council
- United Nations Department of Political and Peacebuilding Affairs, provides secretarial support to the Security Council
- United Nations Security Council Counter-Terrorism Committee, a standing committee of the Security Council
- PassBlue
