= United Nations Art Collection =

Collection of gifts to the UN

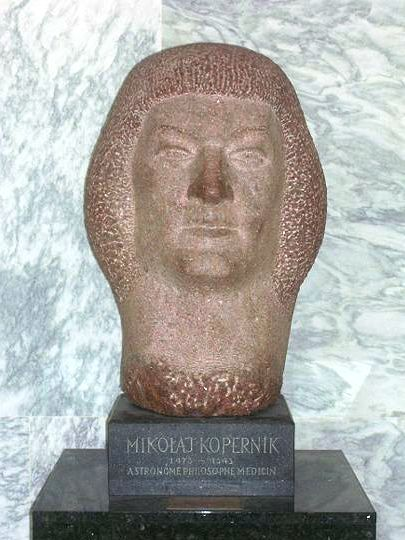
A bust of Nicolaus Copernicus at the United Nations Headquarters, New York City, a gift from the People's Republic of Poland to the United Nations (1970).

The United Nations Art Collection is a collective group of artworks and historic objects donated as gifts to the United Nations by its member states, associations, or individuals. These artistic treasures and possessions, mostly in the form of “sculptures, paintings, tapestries and mosaics”, are representative “arts of nations” that are contained and exhibited within the confines of the United Nations Headquarters in New York City, United States, and other duty stations, making the UN and its international territories a "fine small museum".

Member states follow a protocol for presenting official gifts to the United Nations. Procedures, speeches, and ceremonies, such as the unveiling of these gifts, are conducted and coordinated by the Protocol and Liaison Service. Ideally, every member nation can only present one offering, and member nations are responsible for the installation of the offered artifacts.

The official gifts to the United Nations by its member states epitomize the ideals, significance and values of the UN as an international organization.

== Collection history ==
=== 1950s ===
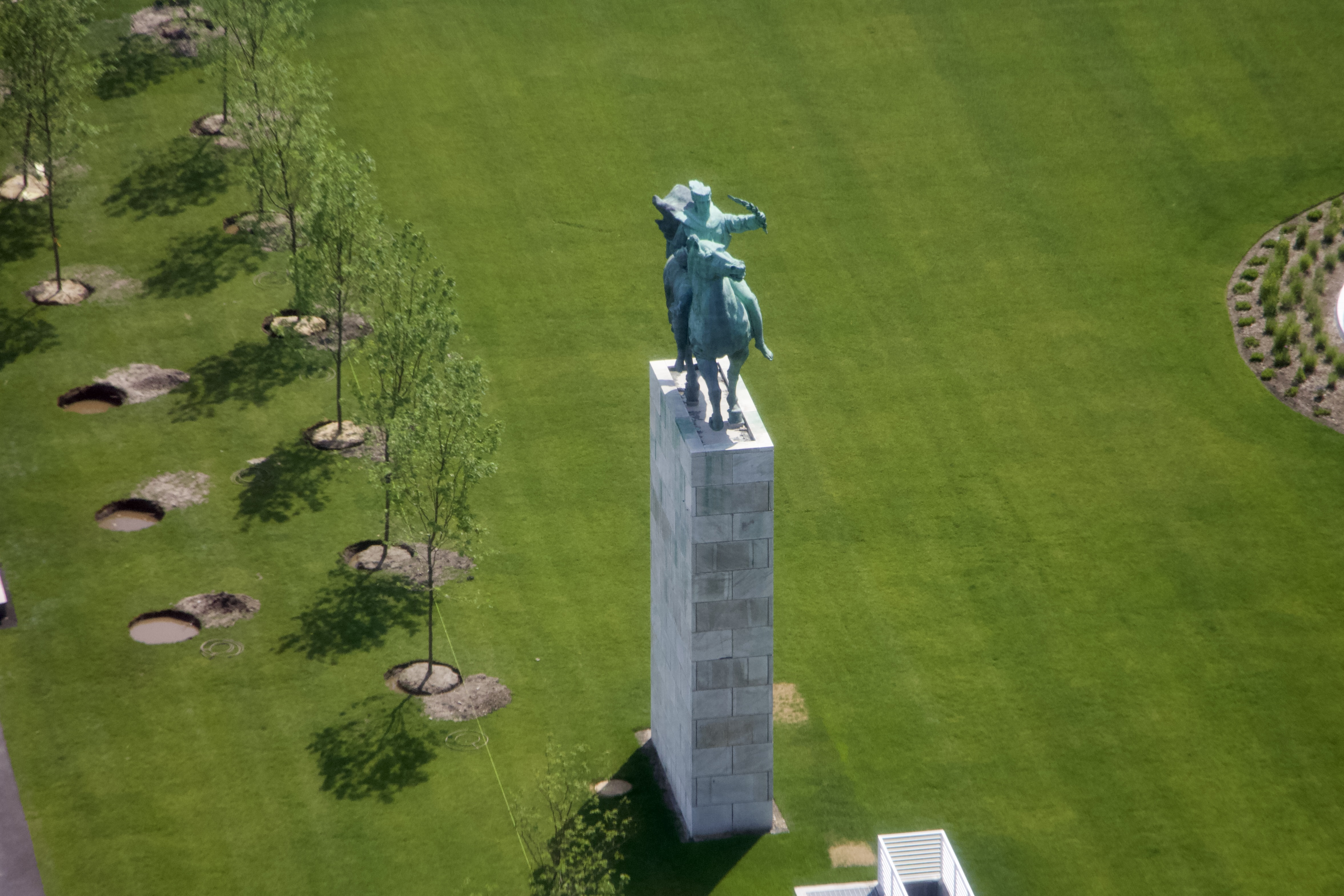
Equestrian Peacekeeping Monument at the United Nations Headquarters in New York City.

In 1952, a pair of Fernand Léger murals was installed in the General Assembly Hall.

Also in 1952, the United Nations Security Council mural, by Per Krohg, was installed.

In June 1954, the Japanese Peace Bell was presented to the United Nations by the United Nations Association of Japan. It was cast from coins collected by people from 60 different countries including children, and housed in a structure resembling a Shinto shrine, made of cypress wood. The bell is rung twice a year: on the first day of Spring, at the Vernal Equinox; and on 21 September to coincide with the opening of the General Assembly.

In 1956, War and Peace, two paintings by Brazilian artist Candido Portinari, were received by the United Nations as a donation from the Government of Brazil. It does not feature any weapons, but instead features the suffering of victims from war, which illustrates the barbarity of combat. The contrast between the elements of chaos and harmony shows how important it is to maintain peace and attempt to end violent conflicts.

In 1959, a bronze statue promoting the slogan Let Us Beat Swords into Ploughshares was donated by the Soviet Union to the United Nations. It was sculpted by Yevgeny Vuchetich to represent the human wish to end all wars by converting the weapons of death and destruction into peaceful and productive tools that are more beneficial to mankind.

=== 1960s ===
In 1964, Single Form, a sculpture done by Barbara Hepworth as a memorial to the UN Secretary General Dag Hammarskjöld after his death in an air crash in Africa in 1961, was donated to the UN by the Jacob Blaustein Foundation.

In 1964, a 15-by-12-foot (4.6 by 3.7 m) stained glass window by Marc Chagall entitled Peace was donated to the United Nations by its own staff members and by Chagall himself to commemorate Dag Hammarskjöld, who had served as United Nations Secretary-General from 1953 until his death in 1961. The stained glass memorial contains numerous symbols representing love and peace themes.

In 1966, a copy of the Nigerian artist Ben Enwonwu's sculpture Anyanwu was presented to the United Nations by the permanent representative of Nigeria to the United Nations, Chief Simeon Adebo, to Secretary-General U Thant. It is a representation of the Igbo mythological figure and earth goddess Ani. It is cast from bronze and is 6 feet (1.8 m) in height.

=== 1980s ===
In 1983, then President of Colombia Belisario Betancur presented a large oil on canvas painting by Alejandro Obregon titled Amanecer en los Andes. The painting is currently exhibited in the second floor of the United Nations General Assembly Building.

In 1985, as a representative of the United States, then first lady Nancy Reagan presented a mosaic to the United Nations to celebrate the organization's 40th anniversary. The Golden Rule mosaic was a creation of Venetian artists and was based on a painting by Norman Rockwell. Depicting people of all races, religion, creed and hue, the mosaic imparts the message to "do unto others as you would have them do unto you".

From 1985 until 2009, a life-size tapestry copy of Pablo Picasso's 1937 painting, Guernica, by Jacqueline de la Baume Dürrbach, was displayed on the wall of the United Nations building in New York City, at the entrance to the Security Council room.

=== 1990s ===
In 1996, Sphere Within Sphere by sculptor Arnaldo Pomodoro was presented as a gift to the UN by Lamberto Dini, Minister for Foreign Affairs of Italy.

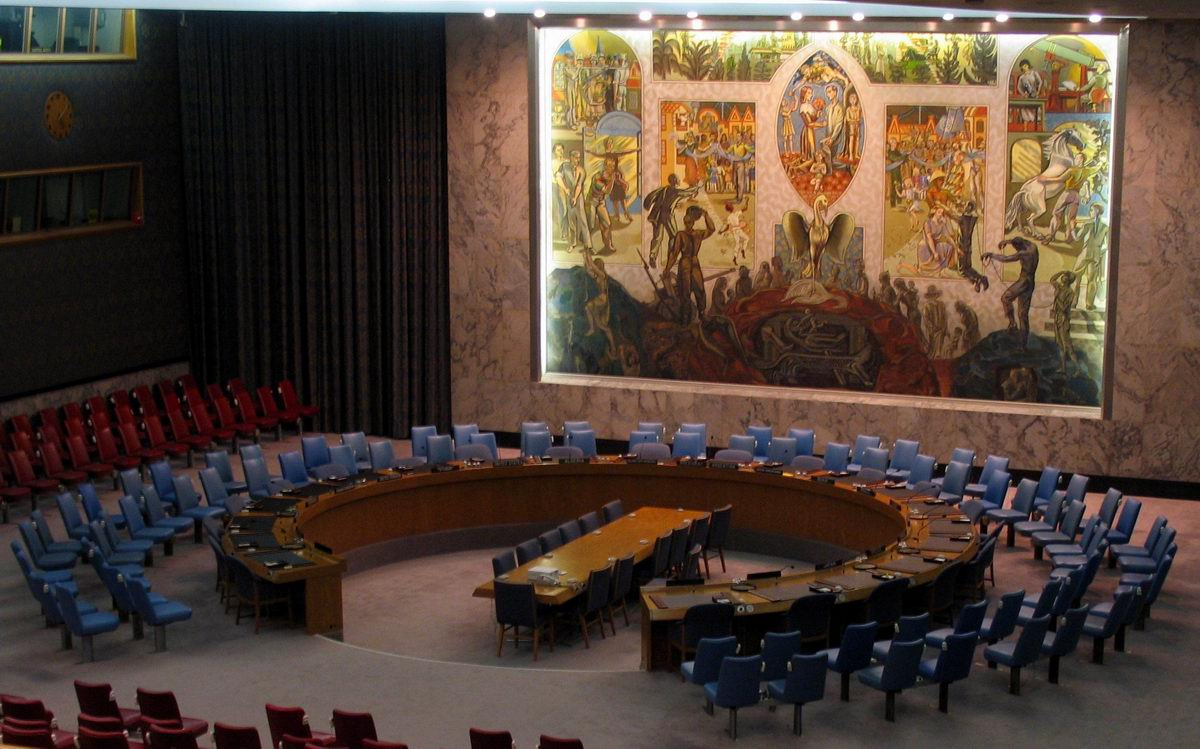
The Security Council meeting room exhibits the mural by Per Krohg (1952)

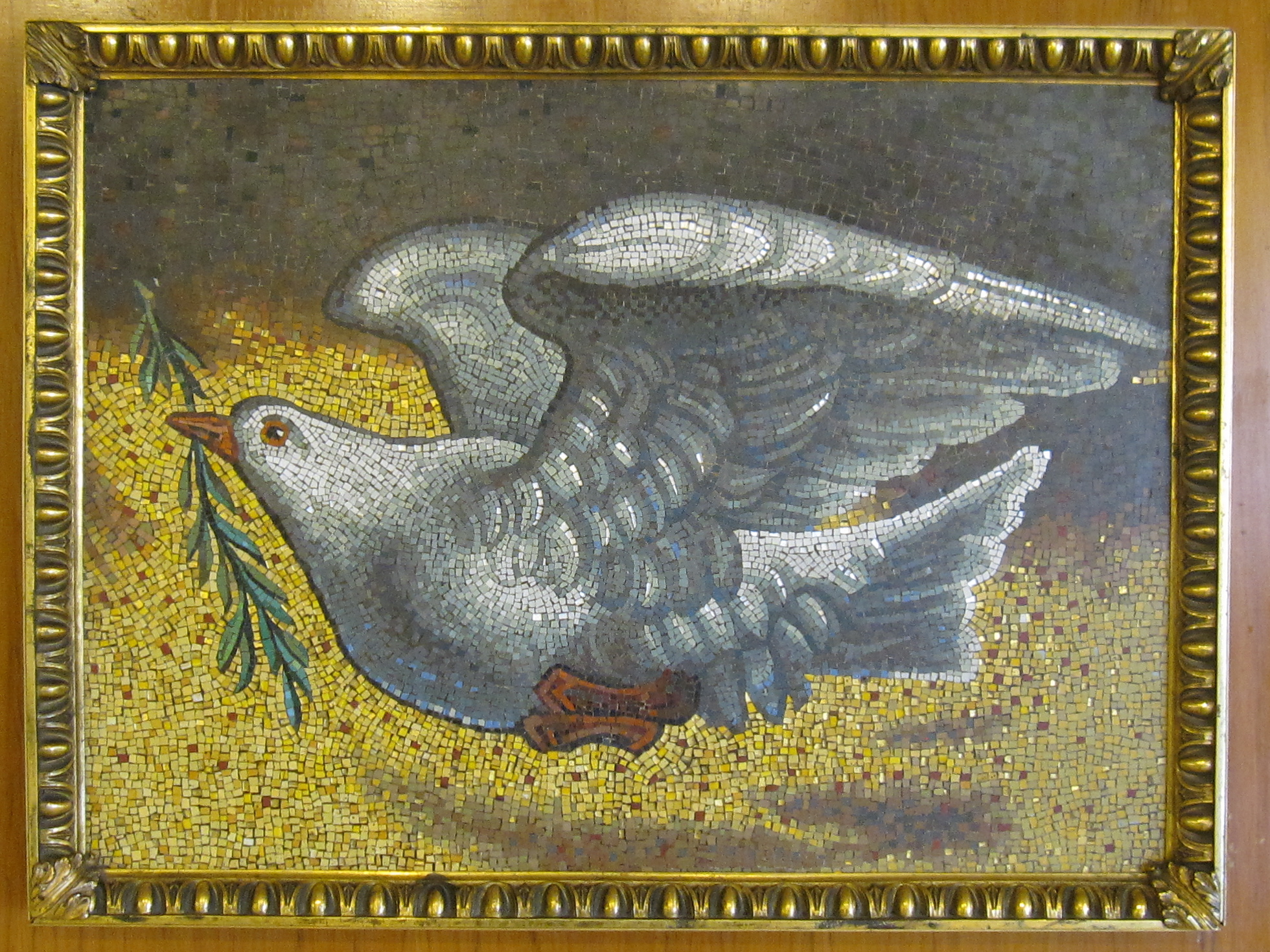
Dove of Peace, presented by Pope John Paul II, on the occasion of his visit to the United Nations, 2 October 1979

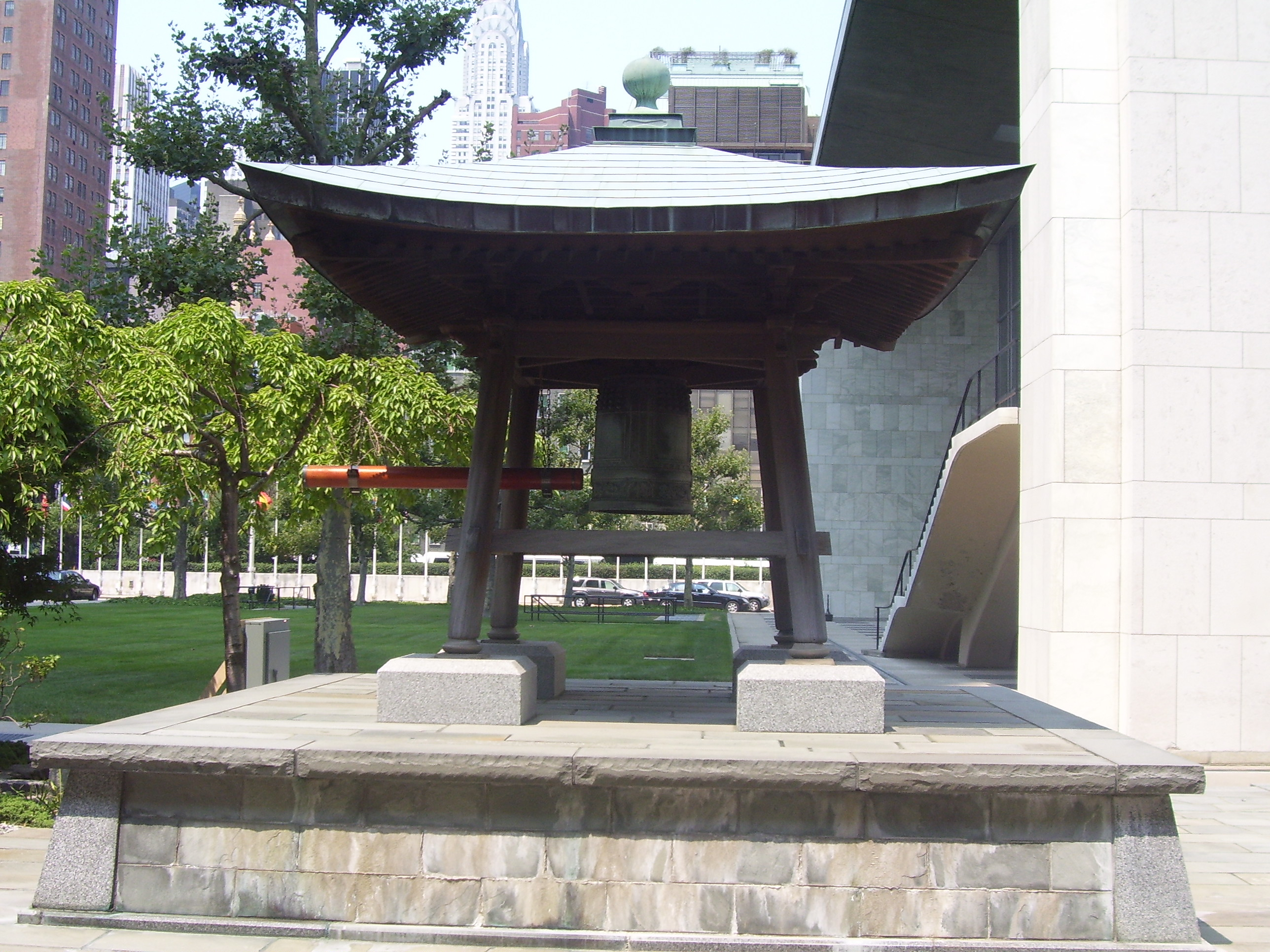
The Japanese Peace Bell, 1954

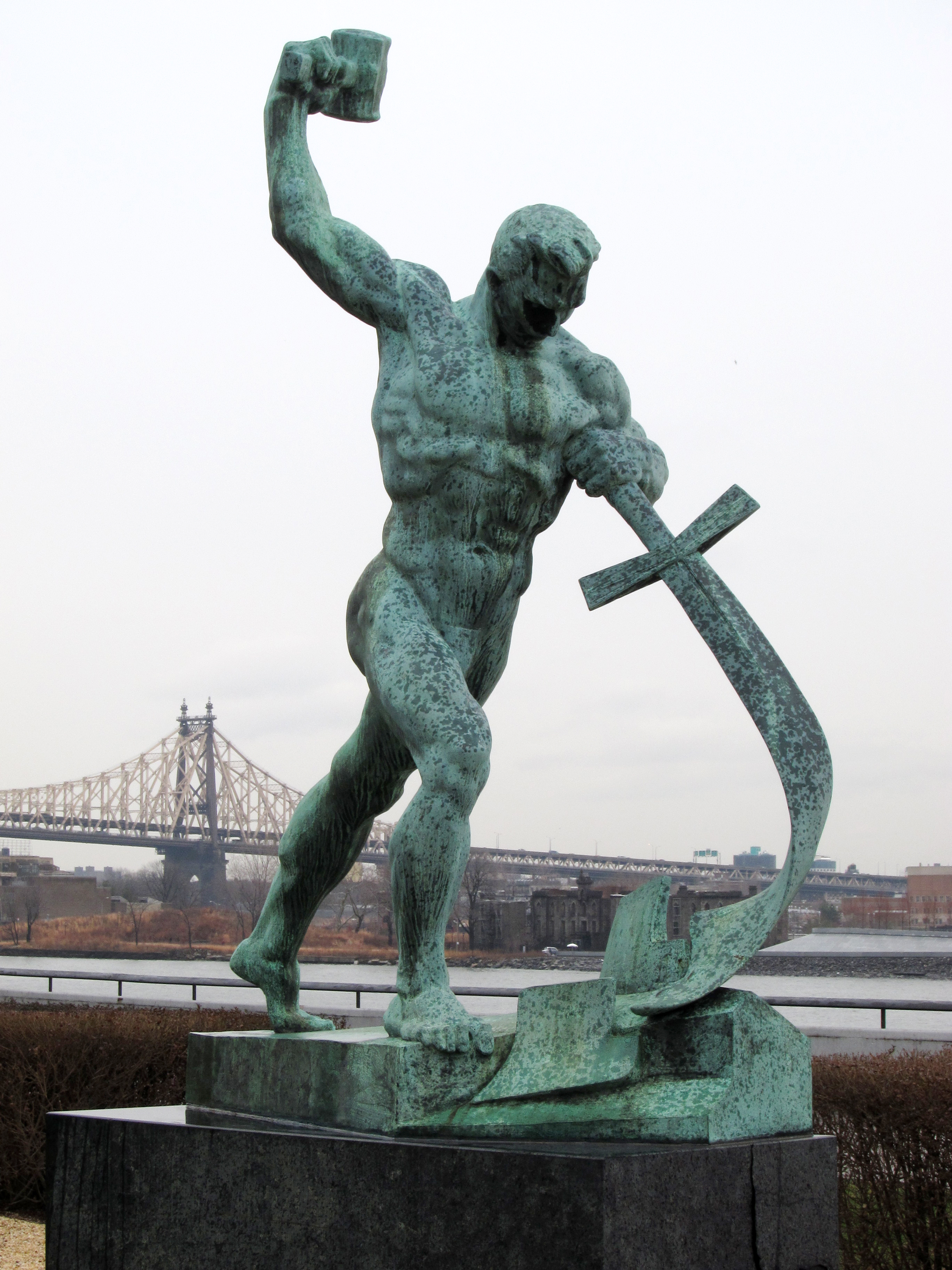
Let Us Beat Swords into Plowshares by Yevgeny Vuchetich, 1959.

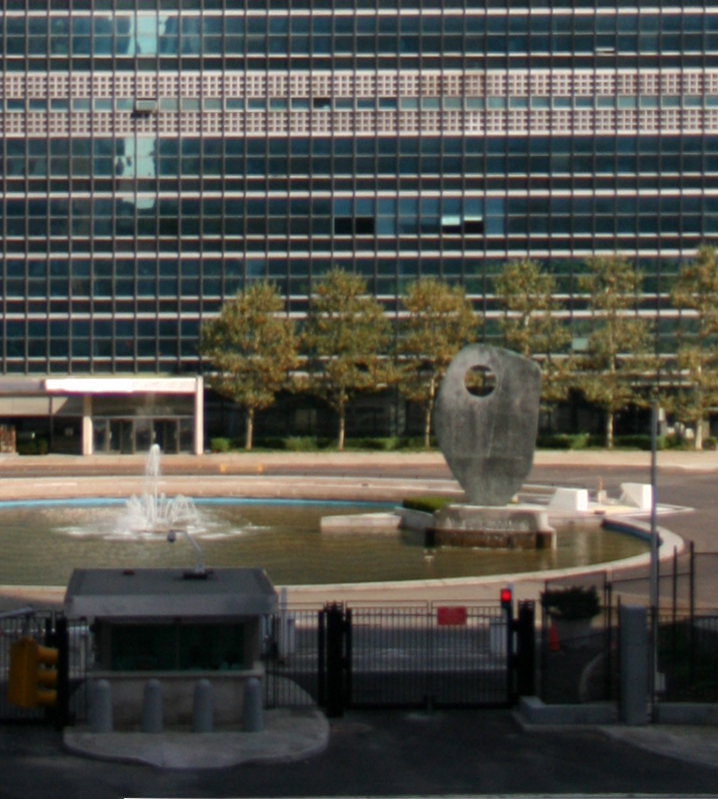
Single Form by Barbara Hepworth is displayed in the pool in front of the Secretariat Building

== Conservation and maintenance ==
The main entity responsible for the conservation of the collection is the UN Arts Committee. The United Nations is assisted, through a special mandate and regulations, by fundraising groups such as the Maecenas World Patrimony Foundation in this endeavor of preserving these artistic and international heritages. However, about 50 gifts, partly close to dissolution, are stored in the basement; and in some cases, have been so for decades.

== See also ==
- Celestial Sphere Woodrow Wilson Memorial
- United Nations Slavery Memorial
