= United Nations Security Council mural =

Mural by Per Krohg

Untitled (Mural for Peace)
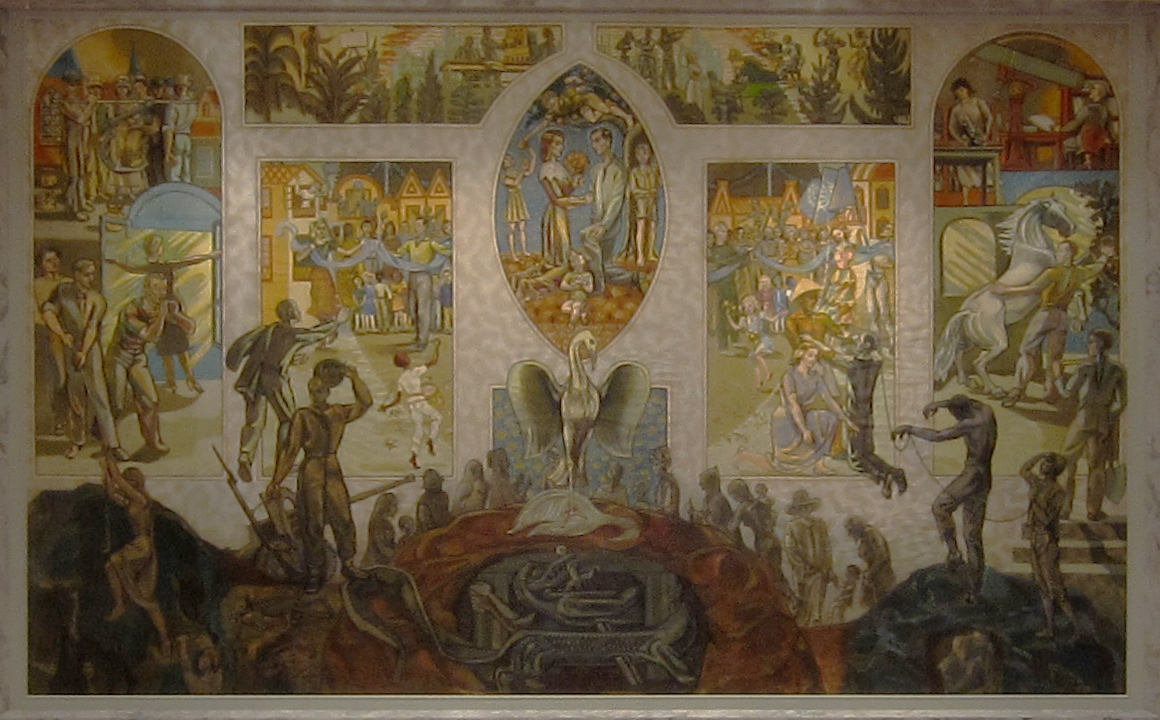
- Artist: Per Krohg
- Year: 1952
- Medium: Oil on canvas
- Dimensions: 5.5 m × 8.8 m (18 ft × 29 ft)
- Location: Headquarters of the United Nations, New York City
- Website: www.un.org/ungifts/untitled-mural-peace

Untitled (Mural for Peace), commonly known as the United Nations Security Council mural, is an oil painting by Norwegian artist Per Krohg exhibited at the Headquarters of the United Nations in New York City since August 22, 1952. The mural, an 18' × 29' canvas located on the UN Security Council chamber's east wall, features a central image of a rising phoenix surrounded by images of war and disharmony, near the mural's bottom, and more tranquil images at the top.

The mural accompanied renovations to the Security Council by Norwegian architect Arnstein Arneberg, and was first publicly displayed on April 4, 1952. It was commissioned by the Norwegian government as a gift from Norway to the United Nations.

In 2013, Norway's Foreign Minister Espen Barth Eide, stated that Krohg's ambition "was to give the United Nations a chamber that could inspire those working in it to carry out the core of the United Nations mandate".

Krohg's mural has been met with controversy. Some, such as the Los Angeles Times, called it "imaginative", while a correspondent for the BBC described it as "the world's worst mural, at which I have sat and gazed for many bewildering hours".

== Artist background ==
Per Krohg, also known as Per Lasson Krohg, was born June 18, 1889, in Oslo Norway and died March 3, 1965, in Oslo aged 75. As the son of painter Christian Krohg, Per Krohg studied under his father at the Academie Colarossie art school in Paris between 1903 and 1907. Between 1907 and 1909 Krohg was a pupil of French painter Henri Matisse. He then returned to Norway and was appointed a professor at the Oslo State Art and Craft School. As identified by Encyclopedia Britannica, "Krohg's early paintings were primarily landscapes and portraits, but his large, expressive, flowing strokes were better suited to the monumental character of mural paintings".

== Selection and design process ==
The United Nations entrusted Norway to fit out and decorate the Security Council while Sweden and Denmark were responsible for the General Assembly Building and Secretariat Building. These three Scandinavian countries were given the role of expressing the "important political, diplomatic and symbolic position assigned to these countries during the first phase of the United Nations Organisation". According to Glambeck, the work of Per Krohg and other Norwegian artists was selected by Jacques Carlu and Howard Robertson from the United Nations Art Panel to be presented to the United Nations Security General.

Once selected to complete the mural, the local authorities in Oslo created an art studio for Krohg to use in the creation of the mural which was located in Oslo's Town Hall. In 1940 Krohg designed the artwork and presented sketches to the United Nations.

== Artistic inspiration ==
Krohg's mural design was inspired by traditional Italian Renaissance frescoes. He reinterpreted renaissance frescoes with modern forms of painting by applying oil paints to a large piece of dry canvas. Krogh's strong Christian faith was also a key inspiration to his mural, as his modern interpretation of Italian Renaissance Frescoes resemble the religious murals found in Catholic churches. When painting the mural Krohg was also inspired by his teacher Henri Matisse. Matisse inspired Krohg to utilise a mix of fauvist colours, exaggerated gestures and depictions of everyday life. Krohg was also part of a group of four Norwegian artists including Henrik Sorensen, Jean Heiberg and Axel Revold who emphasised the purpose of their art as a form of moral education. This is evident in the United Nations Security Council mural through Krohg's aim to create an artwork which inspires peace and harmony.

== Subject ==
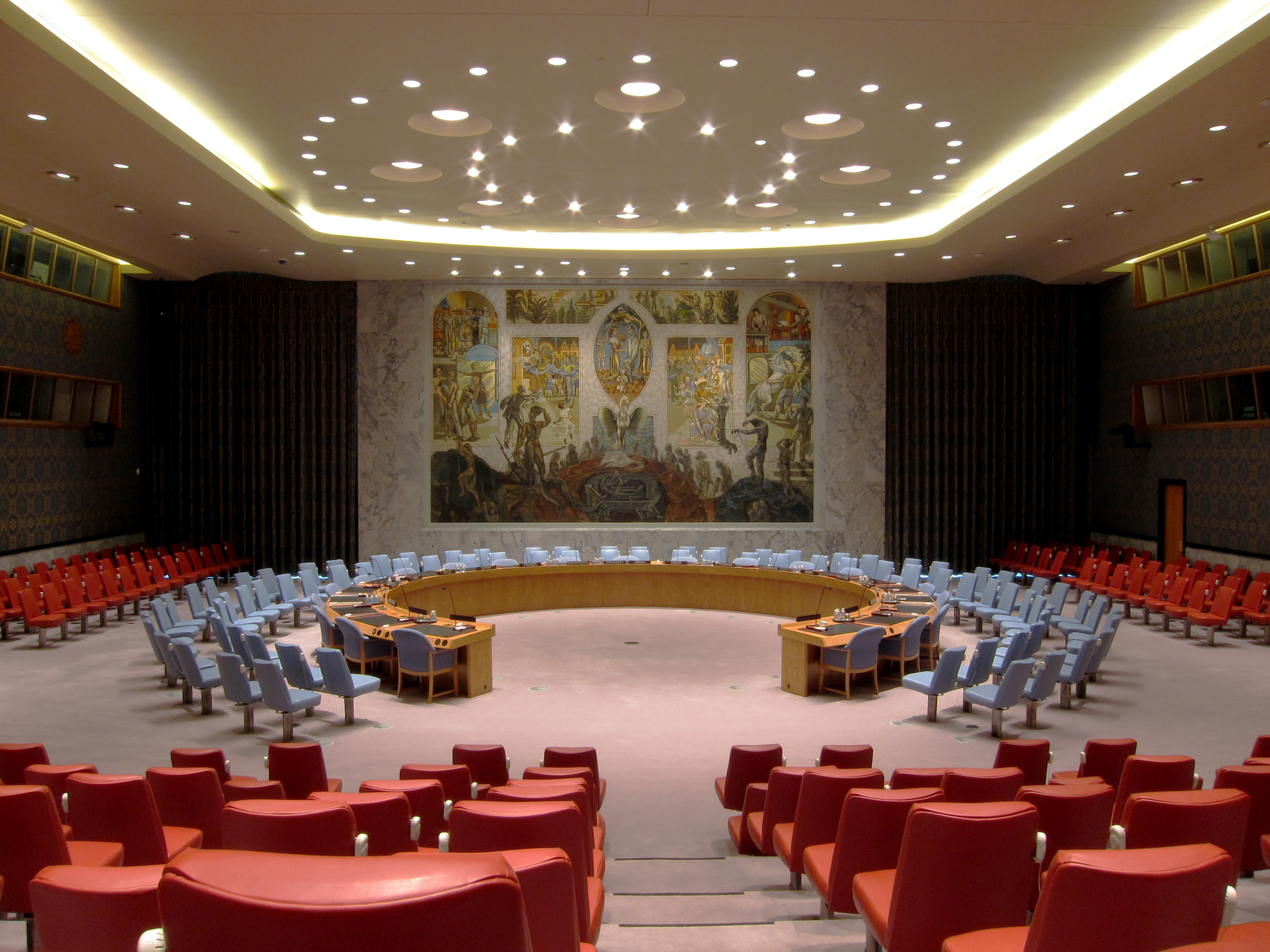
The mural as seen from the Security Council observation seats

Krohg's artwork consists of eight main elements, one large bottom field and seven separate framed panels. These panels combine to display a pictorial story which can be read as a horizontal and vertical story.

=== Bottom field ===
In the bottom field Krohg used brown and red tones to depict a coiled dragon holding a sword in its mouth as it attempts to pull it out of its body. Above the dragon Krohg has painted a bridge and a sloping hill in which humans are climbing towards a brighter field above. These men, women and children are moving from each side of the sloping hill to meet in the middle where a white phoenix stands with its wings unfolded. Krohg wanted to display an image of the future world in which the United Nations would save the world, just as according to his Christian belief, Jesus Christ saved the world. This is demonstrated through his use of a framework of Christian iconology where he has replaced Christ with a rising phoenix.

According to the United Nations the bottom field of the mural "represents man's efforts to emerge from a dark past of war and slavery to a better life and a future illumined by science and the arts". On the right side of the bottom field, Krohg has created an image of three shackled men which are embraced by the human figures in the panel above. On the left side a female figure is climbing up a rope also moving towards a brighter panel above. Both images on the right and left side depict "multiple scenes of human struggle with life and death".

=== Square panels ===
In the two square panels the forefront displays a crowd of joyful people from different ethnicities and a background filled with urban architecture. A line of blue silk runs between the two square panels and the vibrant colours creates a "striking contrast between the dark figure climbing into the urban area with their backs to us and the colourfully dressed crowd facing us". The line of blue silk running between the two square panels illustrates the United Nations' commitment to future peace and individual freedom. In the right square panel, a man stands waving the United Nations flag among the joyful crowd, emphasising the role of the United Nations in creating a peaceful world after World War II.

=== Central panel ===
The almond-shaped piece, also known as a mandorla, sits in the centre of the artwork above the phoenix and displays an image of calmness and serenity as a man, woman, and child sit kneeling. This panel reflects the Security Council's main purpose - "to maintain the world in a state of peace". The woman is kneeling with a bouquet of flowers in her hand and holds the elbow of the man next to her. Above the couple a tree is pictured where a figure is depicted handing an orange fruit to the child below, symbolising charity. As stated by Trygve Neergaard, Krohg was inspired by his heritage and his painting Peace in the Norwegian National Museum. In this artwork, "the children surrounded the solemnly kneeling parents in safe tranquility", inspiring Krohg to place a similar concept in the centre of the United Nations Security Council. On the right side of the tree a young boy stands observing the familial bliss shared between the kneeling figures.

=== Extreme left panel ===
The extreme left panel also depicts a city environment. The highlight of the panel is a human figure depicted as opening a window, allowing sunshine to enter in the room. A man is also pictured, pulling a woman from the dark world below. At the top of this panel six figures engage in a business trade and exchange different tools and bags of wheat. This illustrates movement from World War II towards harmony and sharing.

=== Extreme right panel ===
In this panel Krohg illustrates an image of a man standing next to a prancing horse, admired by a figure with a pickaxe in dark hues from below. Above the horse sits a woman looking into a microscope and man looking into a telescope, illustrating the world's increasing knowledge and value of health and science.

=== Top left field ===
The entire top field is dominated by green trees that resemble palms and cypress trees. On the left two figures are depicted building a form of architecture which has been suggested to resemble Oslo City Hall and represents industrial expansion. In the top left corner a figure stands next to a blank canvas and begins to paint the Sun in front of him.

=== Top right field ===
The right top panel is also dominated by images of vegetation similarly found in the top left field. This panel displays three distinct images. A pair of dancing jesters, a figure playing a piano and two men in the background playing musical instruments and illustrates the movement of society towards valuing fine arts, music and theatre. The backdrop is also covered by skyscrapers creating another image of a city environment.

== Composition ==
=== Equality and harmony ===
Scenes of equality are displayed in the two rectangular panels were Krohg has depicted images of enslaved men being embraced by crowds of people from different ethnicities. In the right panel a man in an Asian conical hat pulls a light-skinned bareheaded man from the devastation beneath them, symbolising equality with people from different continents. As explained by the United Nations, "equality is symbolised by a group of people weighing out grain for all to share".

=== Familial bliss ===
The almond-shaped centre panel symbolises the desire for a good family which shares compassion and harmony in the new world order. Krohg sought to encapsulate the expectations of the Security Council to "operate as the custodian of international order in the post-war era".

=== Restoration ===
The dark tones and ashes depicted in the bottom field of the artwork are symbolic of World War II, an event which influenced Krohg's mural. As identified by the artist, "the essence of the idea is to give an impression of light, security and joy. The world we see in the foreground is collapsing, while the new world based on clarity and harmony can be built up". The image of a woman opening a window to allow sunshine into the room in the extreme left panel expresses the new harmonious world removed from forces of evil. Krohg wanted the artwork to inspire the delegates in the Security Council chamber to ensure the work of the United Nations provides the opportunity for a new and more valuable life after the tragedies of World War II.

=== Faith ===
Throughout the mural, Krohg has combined elements from different Christian sources. Inspired by an image of Christ rising from the Catholic tradition, Krohg has created an image of a rising white phoenix, making the mural relatable to universal audiences. Further references are made to the Greek Orthodox Church through the use of an almond-shaped centre panel called a mandorla, which traditionally displays sacred images.

== After completion ==
Between April 2010 and 2013, the mural was removed to be cleaned, reassembled, and redisplayed in the Security Council. The Norwegian government donated US$8.2 million to assist with the renovations to the Security Council Chamber. The renovations involved replacing the original blue silk displayed in the two rectangular panels, depicting the anchor of faith, growing wheat of hope, and heart of charity, with the textile rayon, due to the original silk shrinking.

== Controversy ==
Several academics have questioned the neutrality of the mural, particularly its reflection on Norway. In an article for the German Review on the United Nations, Maria Sandvik raised the question of whether Norwegian Secretary-General Trygve Lie and head architect Arnstein Arneberg pressured Krohg to paint the artwork in a particular direction. Ingeborg Glambek writes that "it is obvious that the first UN Secretary-General, Trygve Lie of Norway was influential when the decision was made." The head architect of the Security Chamber, Arneberg, has said that in his role as secretary-general, Trygve Lie exercised significant power in ensuring that "Krohg's painting was hung in the council chamber." This controversy has been complicated by the lack of clarity around how Norway and Arneburg financed the creation of Krohg's artwork.

Another controversy developed around Per Krohg's sketched design of the mural, when it was presented to a special group of the United Nations Art Panel. This committee was responsible for assessing all the art proposals for the Security Council. The panel did not initially accept Krohg's artistic concept, citing concerns that the intricacy of the artwork might distract delegates, and cause them to lose concentration. In response, the head architect, Arneburg, rejected the view of the Art Panel, emphasising that the "painting was very important to the effect the room would have as a window on Norwegian culture and art." On January 7, 1950, a royal decree (that cost Norway 109,000 kroner) made it compulsory for the United Nations Art Panel to approve the painting.

== See also ==
- United Nations Art Collection
