= Thomas Astley =

18th-century London bookseller

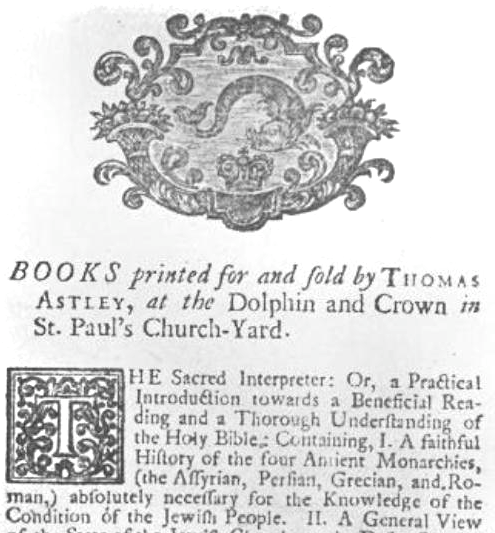
Advert for Thomas Astley at the Dolphin and Crown in St. Paul's Church-Yard, London, 1727

Thomas Astley (died 1759) was a bookseller and publisher in London in the 18th century. He often wrote about relevant topics at the time, and contributed to many of those controversial topics. He ran his business from Saint Paul's Churchyard (circa 1726–1742) and Paternoster Row (circa 1745). He belonged to the Company of Stationers. He published the celebrated Voyages and Travels which described localities in Africa and Asia, compiling information from travel books by John Atkins, Jean Barbot, Willem Bosman, Theodor de Bry, Francis Moore, Jean-Baptiste Labat, Godefroi Loyer, Thomas Phillips, William Smith, and Nicolas Villaut de Bellefond. It included engravings by G. Child and Nathaniel Parr. Astley intended his Voyages to improve upon the previous travel collections of Samuel Purchas, John Harris, and Awnsham & John Churchill. It was read by patrons of Hookham's Circulating Library, Boosey's circulating library, London Institution, Royal Institution, Salem Athenaeum, and Cape Town public library. Astley's Voyages was translated into German (Schwabe (1747–1774), Allgemeine Historie der Reisen, Leipzig) and French (Prévost (1746–1789), Histoire des voyages, Paris).

== Titles issued by Astley ==
- London Magazine
- John Worlidge (1726). Dictionarium Rusticum, Urbanicum & Botanicum: or, a dictionary of husbandry, gardening, trade, commerce, and all sorts of country-affairs (3rd ed.). Printed for J. and J. Knapton, A. Bettesworth – via HathiTrust.
- Christopher Simpson (1732), A Compendium; or, introduction to practical music, London: Printed by W. Pearson, for Arthur Bettesworth, and Charles Hitch; Samuel Birt; John Clarke; Thomas Astley; and John Oswald, OL 24532067M
- The Choice: a Collection of the Newest and Most Celebrated English and Scotch Songs. 1733 – via Eighteenth Century Collections Online of Cengage Learning, Inc.
- John Lockman (1737). New Roman History, by Question and Answer.
- Life and Entertaining Adventures of Mr. Cleveland, natural son of Oliver Cromwell. 1741.
- Daniel Defoe (1743). Memoirs of Cap. George Carleton, an English Officer: Who Served in the Two Last Wars Against France and Spain, and was Present in Several Engagements Both in the Fleet and Army.
- London and Country Brewer, London: Printed for Thomas Astley, 1744, OCLC 22476249, OL 24190346M
- John Green, ed. (1745–1747). A New General Collection of Voyages and Travels: consisting of the most esteemed relations, which have been hitherto published in any language, comprehending everything remarkable in its kind, in Europe, Asia, Africa and America. OCLC 773118890. + Index
  - v.1 (via Google Books). "First voyages of the Portugueze to the East Indies, 1418-1546. First voyages of the English to Guinea, and the East Indies, 1552-1598. First voyages of the English to the East Indies, set forth by the company of merchants, 1600-1620. Voyages to Africa and the islands adjacent, 1455-1721"
  - v.2 (via University of Virginia). "Voyages and travels along the western coast of Africa, 1637-1735. Voyages and travels to Guinea and Benin, 1666-1726. Description of Guinea"
  - v.3. "Voyages and travels to Guinea, Benin, Kongo and Angola. Description of Loango, Kongo, Angola, Benguela, and adjacent countries. Description of the countries along the eastern coast of Africa, from Cape of Good Hope to Cape Guarda Fuy. Voyages and travels in China, 1655-1722"
  - v.4 (via Google Books). "Description of China, of Korea, eastern Tartary and Tibet. Travels through Tartary, Tibet, and Bukhâria, to and from China, 1246-1698" + Table of contents
  - New General Collection of Voyages and Travels. Cass Library of African Studies. Travels and Narratives. London: Frank Cass & Company. 1968. OCLC 1004945. (facsimile reprint)
- Rapin de Thoyras (1752). New History of England, by Question and Answer.
- Bayle's Historical and Critical Dictionary.
- W. Gibson. History of the Affairs of Europe.
- Historico Geographical Description of Russia.
- John Motley. Life of Peter the Great, Czar of Muscovy.
- World in Miniature; or, Entertaining Traveller.
- Universal Pocket Companion.
- W.R. Chetwood. (Novels).
- Henry Stonecastle. Universal Spectator.
- Samuel Hoadly. Natural Method of Teaching.

== See also ==
- Histoire générale des voyages
