= Joel Rogers (disambiguation) =

Joel Rogers is an American academic and political activist.

Joel Rogers may also refer to:

- Joel Augustus Rogers (1880–1966), Jamaican-American author, journalist, and historian
- Joel Townsley Rogers (1896–1984), American writer
