= Andrea H. Japp =

French scientist and author

- Born: Lionelle Nugon; September 17, 1957 (62 years old) Paris, France

Andrea H. Japp, born on September 17, 1957, is a French scientist and author. Considered as one of the leading authors of crime fiction writing in France, Japp is best known for her Kit Salinger series of crime novels, and has also written a number of standalone novels, including The Scent of Blue (2000) and The Promise of Water (2002). She has contributed to various genres such as suspense, thriller, history and so on. She is also the French translator of Patricia Cornwell's novels featuring the character of Kay Scarpetta.

Born in France, Japp has also lived in Switzerland, England, and the United States. She has a doctorate in biochemistry, and trained in Toxicology at MIT and obtained a diploma in bacteriology from the Institut Pasteur. She currently resides in Paris.

In 1991, she published her first detective novel, La Bostonienne, which won the detective novel award at the Festival du Film Policier de Cognac.

In 1998, she was a member of the Festival du Film Policier de Cognac. In 1999, she created the “Black Roots” collection at Le Masque, where she published among other authors such as Brigitte Aubert, Maud Tabachnik, Patrick Raynal. She is also an author of TV dramas and comics, and writes for children.
