= Karim Miské =

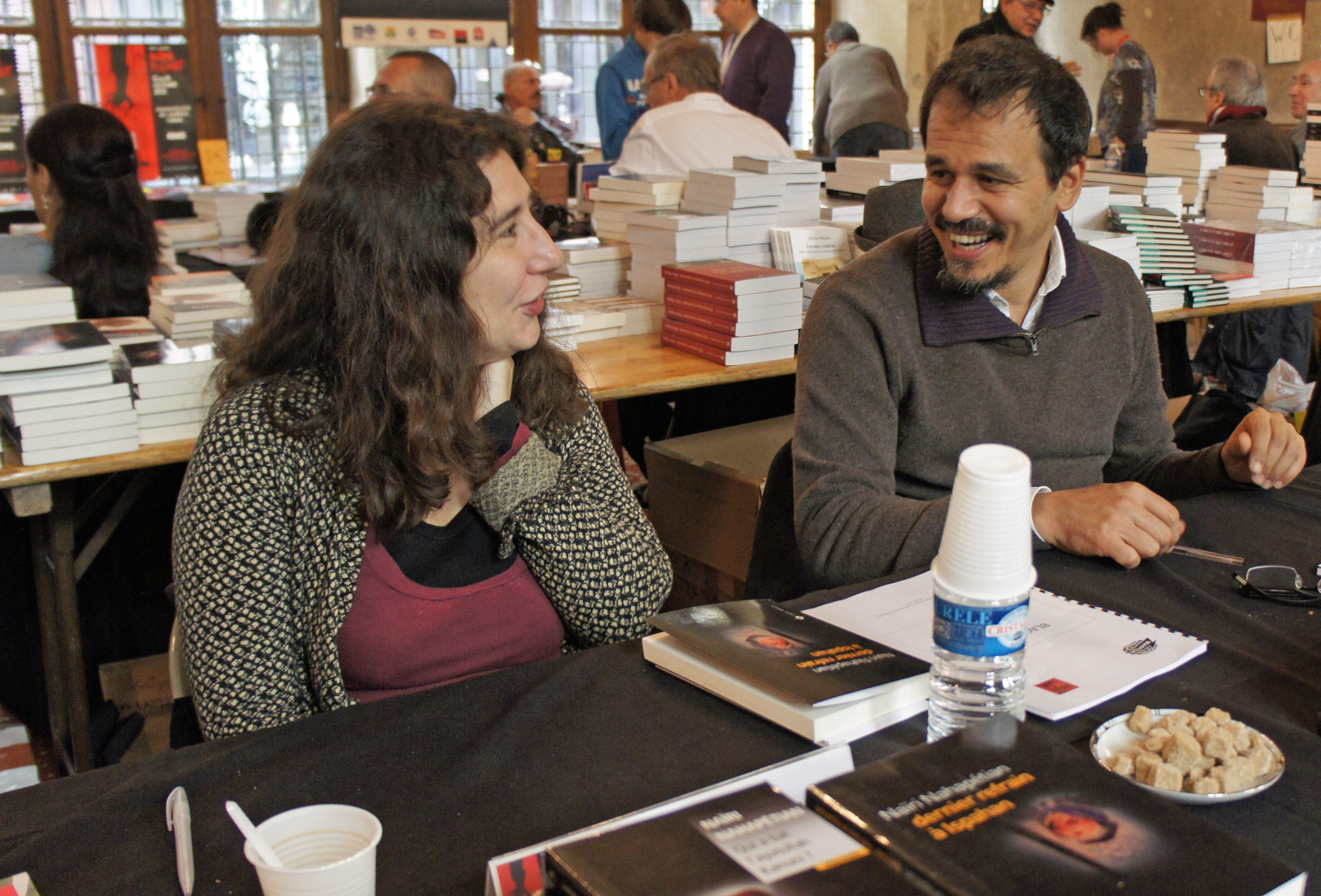
- Born: 1964 (age 60–61); Abidjan, Côte d'Ivoire
- Occupations: documentary film maker; writer

Karim Miské (born 1964, Abidjan, Côte d'Ivoire) is a Mauritanian-French documentary film maker and writer whose debut novel Arab Jazz (2015), a work of crime fiction, was awarded the Grand Prix de Littérature Policière.

== Biography ==
Miské's father was a diplomat from Mauritania; his mother was French. His first documentary film was Économie de la débrouille à Nouakchott (1988), a 26-minute film on Nouakchott, the capital of Mauritania.

== Arab Jazz ==
The novel's main character, Ahmed Taroudant, lives in the north-east of Paris in the 19th arrondissement, and is "a typical French Arab–religiously non-observant, confused about his identity, haunted by the past. An avid reader of crime fiction and a neurotic, he finds himself taking the blame for a murder: his upstairs neighbor Laura, who was in love with him though he never noticed it, is murdered, and her blood drips down his balcony. Two investigators (also readers of crime fiction) are already on the case, and Taroudant himself also tries to uncover what happened.The novel was translated into English by Sam Gordon.

The reviewer for The Guardian, Robin Yassin-Kassab, noted that the novel is full of references to other works of fiction, including James Ellroy's White Jazz. Yassin-Kassab criticized the "somewhat clumsy" dialogue and some "too obviously functional" characters, but praised the settings and the portrayal of French second-generation immigrants from Northern Africa, and Miské's scope: "Everyone’s been damaged by their heritage; everyone’s vulnerable to inner darkness and the explanatory narcotic of grand narrative". The author himself noted how similar his settings are to those of the perpetrators of the Charlie Hebdo shooting; he wrote the book between 2005 and 2010, and set it in Paris's 19th arrondissement, where much of the lives of the two killers took place:

When I heard about the attack on Charlie Hebdo, I was deeply disturbed like most people....Then I heard how the killers crashed their car at Place du Colonel Fabien and that they had hijacked another car and driven down the Rue Petit--all places which appear in Arab Jazz--I thought what is happening? Why have these people invaded my book?

Arab Jazz won the Grand Prix de Littérature Policière in 2015, an award for police and crime fiction in French, and the Prix du Goéland Masqué.
