= Suzanne Blanc =

American mystery writer (1915–1999)

- Born: 1915
- Died: October 5, 1999 (aged 83–84)
- Other name: Suzanne B. Githens
- Occupation: Writer
- Awards: Edgar Allan Poe Award, 1961 Grand Prix de Littérature Policière, 1962

Suzanne Blanc (1915 − October 5, 1999) was an American mystery writer who won an Edgar Allan Poe Award in 1961 and a Grand Prix de Littérature Policière in 1962 for her crime novel The Green Stone. She wrote three other mystery novels and contributed short stories to anthologies and periodicals, including Ellery Queen's Mystery Magazine.

Her novels are set in Mexico and feature characters who suffer from a sense of isolation, according to Jane S. Bakerman in Twentieth Century Crime and Mystery Writers. Bakerman describes Blanc as "a good writer whose canon, though slender, is strong." Of The Green Stone, Kirkus Reviews said, "Atmosphere, incidents and personalities persuasively combined."

== Bibliography ==
- The Green Stone (1961) OCLC 1426573
- The Yellow Villa (1964) OCLC 2077898
- The Rose Window (1967) OCLC 1045841
- The Sea Troll (1969) OCLC 1261
