= Madeleine Coudray =

French writer

Madeleine Coudray (born 1907 in Ruffec, Charente; died 1978 in Orléans) is a French crime writer. Her writing gained attention beginning in the 1960s. She received the 1978 Grand Prix de Littérature Policière award.
