= Abbé Prévost =

French novelist (1697–1763)

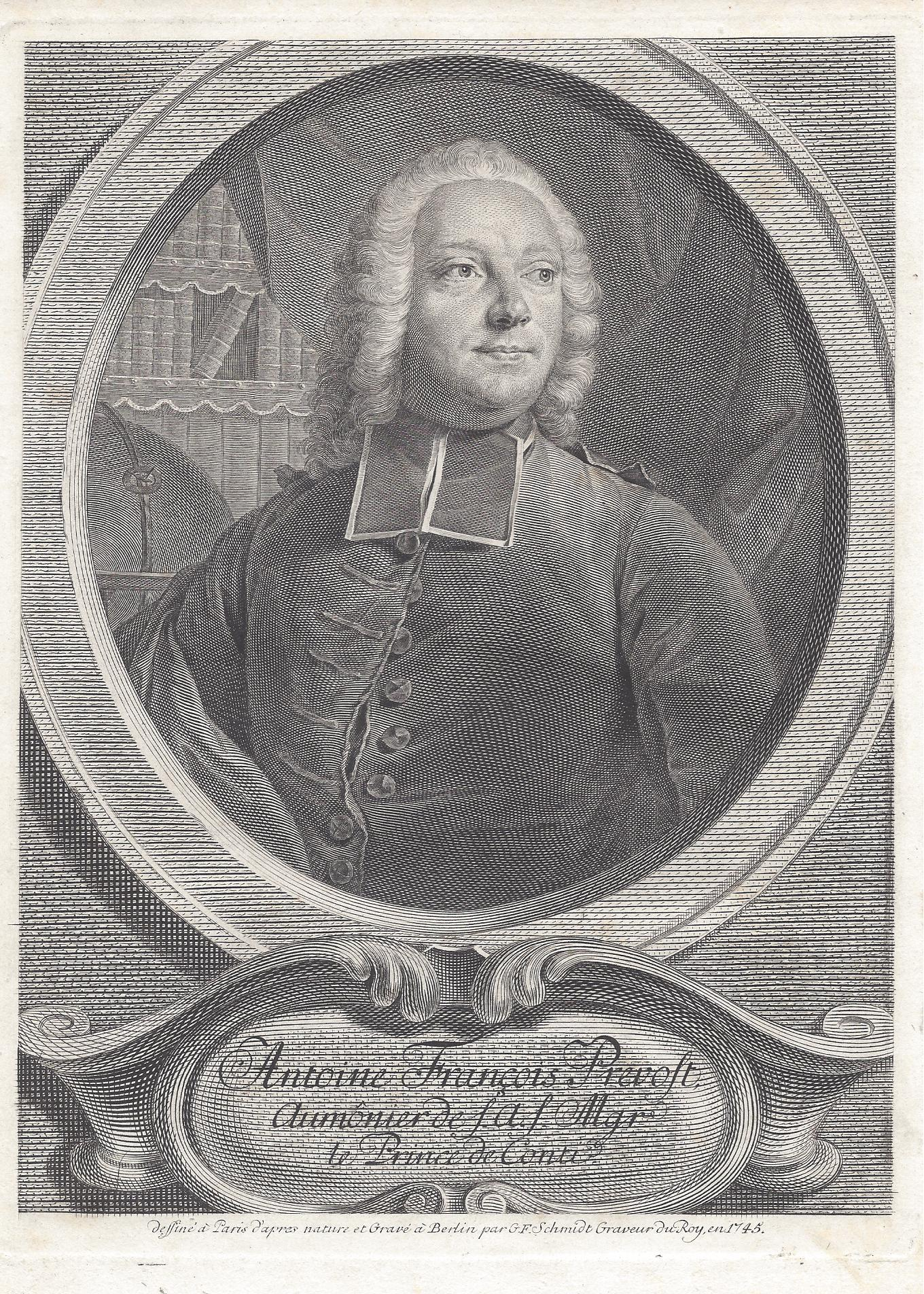
- Portrait by Georg Friedrich Schmidt, 1745
- Born: Antoine François Prévost d'Exiles; 1 April 1697; Hesdin, Artois, France
- Died: 25 November 1763 (aged 66); Courteuil, Picardy, France

Antoine François Prévost d'Exiles (UK: /ˌpreɪvoʊ dɛɡˈziːl/ PRAY-voh deg-ZEEL, US: /preɪˌvoʊ -/ pray-VOH -; French: [ɑ̃twan fʁɑ̃swa pʁevo dɛɡzil]; 1 April 1697 – 25 November 1763), usually known simply as the Abbé Prévost, was a French priest, author, and novelist. He is best remembered for Manon Lescaut (1731), a romance and adventure novel, the most reprinted novel in French literary history.

== Life and works ==
He was born at Hesdin, Artois, and first appears with the full name of Prévost d'Exiles, in a letter to the booksellers of Amsterdam in 1731. His father, Lievin Prévost, was a lawyer, and several members of the family had embraced the ecclesiastical estate. His happy childhood ended abruptly, when he lost his mother and his younger favorite sister at the age of 14. Prévost was educated at the Jesuit school of Hesdin, and in 1713 became a novice of the order in Paris, pursuing his studies at the same time at the college in La Flèche.

At the end of 1716 he left the Jesuits to join the army, but soon tired of military life, and returned to Paris in 1719, apparently with the idea of resuming his novitiate. He is said to have travelled in the Netherlands about this time; in any case he returned to the army, this time with a commission. Some biographers have assumed that he suffered some of the misfortunes assigned to his hero Des Grieux. Whatever the truth, he joined the learned community of the Benedictines of St Maur, with whom he found refuge, he himself says, after the unlucky termination of a love affair. He took his vows at Jumièges in 1721 after a year's novitiate, and in 1726 took priest's orders at St Germer de Flaix. He spent seven years in various houses of the order, teaching, preaching and studying. In 1728 he was sent to the Abbey of Saint-Germain-des-Prés, Paris, where he contributed to the Gallia Christiana, a work of historiographic documentation undertaken communally by the monks in continuation of the works of Denys de Sainte-Marthe, who had been a member of their order. His restless spirit made him seek from the Pope a transfer to the easier rule of Cluny; but he left the abbey without leave (1728), and, learning that his superiors had obtained a lettre de cachet against him, fled to England.

In London he acquired a wide knowledge of English history and literature, as can be seen in his writings. Before leaving the Benedictines Prévost had begun perhaps his most famous novel, Mémoires et aventures d'un homme de qualité qui s'est retiré du monde, the first four volumes of which were published in Paris in 1728, and two years later at Amsterdam. In 1729 he left England for the Netherlands, where he began to publish (Utrecht, 1731) a novel, the material of which, at least, had been gathered in London, Le Philosophe anglais, ou Histoire de Monsieur Cleveland, fils naturel de Cromwell, écrite par lui-même, et traduite de l'anglais par l'auteur des Mémoires d'un homme de qualité (1731–1739, 8 vols., Amsterdam and Paris). A spurious fifth volume (Utrecht, 1734) contained attacks on the Jesuits; an English translation the same year ends with this volume.

Meanwhile, during his residence at the Hague, he engaged on a translation of De Thou's Historia, and, relying on the popularity of his first book, published at Amsterdam a Suite in three volumes, forming volumes v, vi, and vii of the original Mémoires et aventures d'un homme de qualité. The seventh volume contained the famous Manon Lescaut, separately published in Paris in 1731 as Histoire du Chevalier des Grieux et de Manon Lescaut. The book was eagerly read, chiefly in pirated copies, being forbidden in France. The book inspired numerous stage adaptations, including ballets choreographed by Jean Aumer (1830) and Kenneth MacMillan (1974, L'histoire de Manon); and the operas The Maid of Artois (1836) by Michael William Balfe, Manon Lescaut (1856) by Daniel Auber, Manon (1884) by Jules Massenet, Manon Lescaut (1893) by Giacomo Puccini, and Boulevard Solitude (1952) by Hans Werner Henze.

In 1733 he left the Hague for London in company of a lady whose character, according to Prévost's enemies, was doubtful. In London he edited a weekly gazette on the model of Joseph Addison's Spectator, Le Pour et contre, which he continued to produce in collaboration with the playwright Charles-Hugues Le Febvre de Saint-Marc, with short intervals, until 1740.

In the autumn of 1734 Prévost was reconciled with the Benedictines, and, returning to France, was received in the Benedictine monastery of La Croix-Saint-Leufroy in the diocese of Évreux to pass through a new, though brief, novitiate. In 1735 he was dispensed from residence in a monastery by becoming almoner to the Prince de Conti, and in 1754 obtained the priory of St Georges de Gesnes. He continued to produce novels and translations from the English, and, with the exception of a brief exile (1741–1742) spent in Brussels and Frankfurt, he resided for the most part at Chantilly until his death, which took place suddenly while he was walking in the neighbouring woods. The cause of his death, the rupture of an aneurysm, is all that is definitely known. Stories of crime and disaster were related of Prévost by his enemies, and diligently repeated, but appear to be apocryphal.

Prévost's other works include:

- Le Doyen de Killerine, Killerine, histoire morale composée sur les mémoires d'une illustre famille d'Irlande (Paris, 1735; 2nd part, the Hague, 1739, 3rd, 4th and 5th parts, 1740)
- Tout pour l'amour (1735), a translation of Dryden's tragedy
- Histoire d'une Grecque moderne (Amsterdam [Paris] 2 vols., 1740)
- Histoire de Marguerite d'Anjou (Amsterdam [Paris] 2 vols., 1740)
- Mémoires pour servir a l'histoire de Malte (Amsterdam, 1741)
- Campagnes philosophiques, ou mémoires ... contenant l'histoire de la guerre d'Irlande (Amsterdam, 1741)
- Histoire de Guillaume le Conquérant (Paris, 1742)
- Voyages du capitaine Robert Lade en differentes parties de l'Afrique, de l'Asie, et de l'Amerique (Paris, 1744), a fictional travel journal
- Histoire générale des voyages (15 vols., Paris, 1746–1759), continued by other writers
- Manuel Lexique (Paris, 1750), continued by other writers
- Translations (somewhat compacted) from Samuel Richardson: Pamela ou la Vertu récompensée (1741), Lettres anglaises ou Histoire de Miss Clarisse Harlovie (1751), from Richardson's Clarissa, and Nouvelles lettres anglaises, ou Histoire du chevalier Grandisson (Sir Charles Grandison, 1755).
- Mémoires pour servir a l'histoire de la vertu (1762), from Mrs Sheridan's Memoires of Miss Sidney Bidulph
- Histoire de la maison de Stuart (3 vols., 1740) from Hume's History of England to 1688
- Le Monde moral, ou Mémoires pour servir a l'histoire du cœur humain (2 vols., Geneva, 1760)

== Modern editions ==
- The standard edition of Prévost's works is Œuvres, dir. Jean Sgard, Presses Universitaires de Grenoble, 8 vols., 1977–1986.
- There have been many editions of Manon Lescaut of which the most recent are by Jean Sgard (Paris: GF-Flammarion, 1995) and Jean Goulemot (Livre de Poche, 2005). The modern English translation by Helen Waddell (Heritage Press, 1945 - with illustrations by Pierre Brissaud), is quite possibly, the most commonly seen English-language edition on the market.
- Mémoires et aventures d'un homme de qualité, Jean Sgard (ed.), Paris: Desjonquères, 1995.
- There is also a separate edition of Cleveland (i. e., Le Philosophe anglais) by Jean Sgard and Philip Stewart, Paris: Desjonquères, 2003.
- The only complete English translation of Cleveland, entitled The English Philosopher, or History of Mr. Cleveland, natural son of Cromwell, by Philip Stewart (2016)is available in open access on line: http://hdl.handle.net/10161/13014
- Histoire d'une Grecque moderne, ed. Jean Sgard, Presses Universitaires de Grenoble, 1989 (ISBN 2706103345).
- The Greek Girl's Story, ed. and trans. Alan J. Singerman, University Park: Penn State UP, 2014.

== In the works of others ==
In Hubert Monteilhet's novel Murder at the Frankfurt Book Fair, the protagonist plagiarizes Histoire d'une Grecque moderne as a practical joke on his obnoxious publisher.
