= Philippe Huet =

French journalist and novelist (1942–2026)

- Huet in 2014
- Born: 24 April 1942; Le Havre, German-occupied France
- Died: 23 September 2026 (aged 84); Le Havre, France
- Occupations: Journalist, novelist

Philippe Huet (24 April 1942 – 23 September 2026) was a French journalist and novelist. A recipient of the Grand Prix de Littérature Policière, he served as deputy editor-in-chief of Paris-Normandie, a daily newspaper in Rouen.

Huet died in Le Havre on 23 September 2026, at the age of 84.
