= Grand Prix de Littérature Policière =

French literary prize

The Grand Prix de Littérature Policière (or the Police Literature Grand Prize) is a French literary prize founded in 1948 by author and literary critic Maurice-Bernard Endrèbe. It is the most prestigious award for crime and detective fiction in France. Two prizes are awarded annually to the best French novel and to the best international crime novel published in that year.

== French Prize ==
=== 1940s ===
- 1948 – Le Cinquième procédé by Léo Malet
- 1949 – La Parole est au mort by Odette Sorensen (fr)

=== 1950s ===
- 1950 – Jeux pour mourir by Géo-Charles Véran (fr)
- 1951 – Fumées sans feu by Jacques Decrest et Germaine Decrest (fr)
- 1952 – Passons la monnaie by André Piljean (fr)
- 1953 – Opération Odyssée by Jean-Pierre Conty (fr)
- 1954 – La Beauté qui meurt by François Brigneau
- 1955 – Assassin mon frère by Gilles-Maurice Dumoulin (fr)
- 1956 – Pleins feux sur Sylvie by Michel Lebrun and Les Petites mains de la Justice by Guy Venayre (fr)
- 1957 – Le Bourreau pleure by Frédéric Dard
- 1958 – On n'enterre pas le dimanche by Fred Kassak (fr)
- 1959 – Deuil en rouge by Paul Gerrard

=== 1960s ===
- 1960 – The Praying Mantises by Hubert Monteilhet
- 1962 – Le Procès du Diable by Pierre Forquin (fr)
- 1963 – Trap for Cinderella by Sébastien Japrisot
- 1964 – La Jeune morte by Michel Carnal (fr)
- 1965 – Bâteau en Espagne by Marc Delory (fr)
- 1966 – L'interne de service by Laurence Oriol (fr)
- 1967 – Le Crocodile est dans l'escalier by Jean-Pierre Alem (fr)
- 1968 – Un beau monstre by Dominique Fabre
- 1969 – Drôle de pistolet by Francis Ryck

=== 1970s ===
- 1970 – Zigzags by Paul Andréota
- 1971 – L'Assassin maladroit by René Réouven
- 1972 – Le Canal rouge by Gilbert Tanugi
- 1973 – O Dingos, O Châteaux by Jean-Patrick Manchette
- 1974 – De 5 à 7 avec la mort by André-Paul Duchâteau
- 1975 – Un incident indépendant de notre volonté by Yvon Toussaint
- 1976 – Les Sirènes de minuit by Jean-François Coatmeur
- 1977 – La Plus longue course d'Abraham Coles, chauffeur de taxi by Christopher Diable
- 1978 – Dénouement avant l'aube by Madeleine Coudray
- 1979 – Le Salon du prêt à saigner by Joseph Bialot

=== 1980s ===
- 1980 – Le Crime d'Antoine by Dominique Roulet (fr)
- 1981 – Reflets changeants sur mare de sang, L'Unijambiste de la côte 284, and Aime le maudit by Pierre Siniac
- 1982 – L'Audience solennelle by Jean-Pierre Cabannes (fr)
- 1983 – Collabo song by Jean Mazarin (fr)
- 1984 – Sur la terre comme au ciel by René Belletto
- 1985 – Meurtres pour mémoire by Didier Daeninckx
- 1986 – La queue du scorpion by Christian Gernigon (fr)
- 1986 – N'oubliez pas l'artiste by Gérard Delteil (fr)
- 1987 – Trois morts au soleil by Jacques Sadoul
- 1988 – Aix abrupto by Jean-Paul Demure (fr)
- 1989 – Un gros besoin d'amour by Tito Topin (fr)

=== 1990s ===
- 1990 – Billard à l'étage by Michel Quint
- 1991 – Hôpital souterrain by Hervé Jaouen (fr)
- 1992 – La Commedia des ratés by Tonino Benacquista
- 1993 – Boulevard des ombres by Paul Couturiau (fr)
- 1994 – Tiré à part by Jean-Jacques Fiechter (fr)
- 1995 – La Main morte by Philippe Huet
- 1996 – Ambernave by Jean-Hugues Oppel (fr)
- 1997 – La Mort des bois by Brigitte Aubert
- 1998 – Sans homicide fixe by Serge Gardebled (fr)
- 1999 – La Paresse de Dieu by Laurent Bénégui (fr)

=== 2000s ===
- 2000 – Du bruit sous le silence by Pascal Dessaint (fr)
- 2001 – Chasseurs de têtes by Michel Crespy (fr)
- 2002 – Les Brouillards de la Butte by Patrick Pécherot (fr)
- 2003 – L'Ivresse des dieux by Laurent Martin (fr)
- 2004 – Double peine by Virginie Brac (fr)
- 2004 – Les Silences de Dieu by Gilbert Sinoue
- 2005 – Le Testament de Dieu by Philippe Le Roy (fr)
- 2006 – La Colère des enfants déchus by Catherine Fradier (fr)
- 2007 – Citoyens clandestins by DOA (fr)
- 2008 – Zulu by Caryl Férey (fr)
- 2009 – Les Cœurs déchiquetés by Hervé Le Corre (fr)

=== 2010s ===
- 2010 – Adieu Jérusalem by Alexandra Schwartzbrod (fr)
- 2011 – L’Honorable Société by DOA (fr) and Dominique Manotti (fr)
- 2012 – Arab jazz by Karim Miské (fr)
- 2013 – Des nœuds d'acier by Sandrine Collette (fr)
- 2014 – Pur by Antoine Chainas (fr)
- 2015 – Derrière les panneaux, il y a des hommes by Joseph Incardona
- 2016 – Un trou dans la toile by Luc Chomarat
- 2017 – La Daronne by Hannelore Cayre
- 2018 – L'été circulaire by Marion Brunet
- 2019 – Le Cherokee by Richard Morgiève

=== 2020s ===
- 2020 – La fabrique de la terreur by Frédéric Paulin
- 2021 – Rosine, une criminelle ordinaire by Sandrine Cohen
- 2022 – Le Carré des indigents by Hugues Pagan
- 2023 – Darwyne by Colin Niel

== International Prize ==
=== 1940s ===
- 1948 – The Bellamy Trial by Frances Noyes Hart (US, 1927)
- 1949 – Puzzle for Pilgrims by Patrick Quentin (US, 1947)

=== 1950s ===
- 1950 – After Midnight by Martha Albrand (US, 1948)
- 1951 – The Red Right Hand by Joel Townsley Rogers (US, 1945)
- 1952 – Follow as the Night by Patricia McGerr (US, 1951)
- 1953 – The End is Known by Geoffrey Holiday Hall (US, 1949)
- 1953 – Horns for the Devil by Louis Malley (US, 1951)
- 1954 – The Body in Grant's Tomb (short story) by Cornell Woolrich (US, 1943)
- 1955 – Death in Captivity by Michael Gilbert (UK, 1952)
- 1956 – The Desperate Hours by Joseph Hayes (US, 1954)
- 1956 – Nothing in Her Way by Charles Williams (US, 1953)
- 1957 – The Talented Mr. Ripley by Patricia Highsmith (US, 1955)
- 1958 – The Five Cornered Square by Chester Himes (US, 1956)
- 1959 – Orders to Kill by Donald Downes (US, 2065)

=== 1960s ===
- 1960 – The Evil of the Day by Thomas Sterling (UK, 1955)
- 1961 – no prize awarded
- 1962 – The Green Stone by Suzanne Blanc (US, 1961)
- 1963 – The Ballad of the Running Man by Shelley Smith (UK, 1961)
- 1964 – A Key to the Suite by John D. MacDonald (US, 1963)
- 1965 – Gun before Butter by Nicolas Freeling (UK, 1963)
- 1966 – The Berlin Memorandum by Adam Hall (UK, 1965)
- 1967 – I Start Counting by Audrey Erskine Lindop (UK, 1966)
- 1968 – Traitors to All (Traditori di tutti) by Giorgio Scerbanenco (Italy, 1966)
- 1969 – The Daughter of Time by Josephine Tey (UK, 1951)
- 1969 – Fire, Burn! by John Dickson Carr (US, 1957)

=== 1970s ===
- 1970 – The Flaw (Το Λάθος) by Antonis Samarakis (Greece, 1965)
- 1971 – Hit and Run, Run, Run (Hændeligt uheld) by Anders Bodelsen (Denmark, 1968)
- 1971 – The Ledger by Dorothy Uhnak (US, 1970)
- 1972 – The Children Are Watching by Laird Koenig & Peter L. Dixon (US, 1970)
- 1973 – Millie by E. V. Cunningham (US, 1973)
- 1974 – Mirror, Mirror on the Wall by Stanley Ellin (US, 1972)
- 1975 – The Dark Number by Edward Boyd & Roger Parkes (UK, 1973)
- 1976 – Doctor Frigo by Eric Ambler (UK, 1974)
- 1977 – City of the Death by Herbert Lieberman (US, 1976)
- 1978 – And on the Eighth Day by Ellery Queen (US, 1964)
- 1979 – The Chain of Chance (Katar) by Stanisław Lem (Poland, 1975)

=== 1980s ===
- 1980 – A Stranger is Watching by Mary Higgins Clark (US, 1977)
- 1981 – The South Seas by Manuel Vázquez Montalbán (Spain, 1979)
- 1982 – Party of the Year by John Crosby (US, 1982)
- 1983 – No Comebacks by Frederick Forsyth (UK, 1982)
- 1984 – The Maine Massacre by Janwillem Van de Wetering (US, 1979)
- 1985 – Swing, Swing Together by Peter Lovesey (UK, 1976)
- 1986 – City Primeval by Elmore Leonard (US, 1980)
- 1987 – Dance Hall of the Dead by Tony Hillerman (US, 1974)
- 1988 – A Taste for Death by P. D. James (UK, 1986)
- 1988 – Strega by Andrew Vachss (US, 1987)
- 1989 – Snowbound by Bill Pronzini (US, 1974)

=== 1990s ===
- 1990 – A Great Deliverance by Elizabeth George (US, 1988)
- 1991 – The Silence of the Lambs by Thomas Harris (US, 1988)
- 1992 – Black Cherry Blues by James Lee Burke (US, 1989)
- 1993 – The Flanders Panel by Arturo Pérez-Reverte (Spain, 1990)
- 1994 – Cabal by Michael Dibdin (UK, 1992)
- 1995 – Degree of Guilt by Richard North Patterson (US, 1993)
- 1996 – The Alienist by Caleb Carr (US, 1994)
- 1997 – Imperfect Strangers by Stuart Woods (US, 1995)
- 1998 – Shadow Play by Frances Fyfield (UK, 1993)
- 1999 – Blood Work by Michael Connelly (US, 1998)

=== 2000s ===
- 2000 – River of Darkness by Rennie Airth (South Africa, 1999)
- 2001 – In a Dry Season by Peter Robinson (Canada, 1999)
- 2002 – One Foot in the Grave by Peter Dickinson (UK, 1979)
- 2003 – Dead before Dying by Deon Meyer (South Africa, 1999)
- 2004 – The Analyst by John Katzenbach (US, 2002)
- 2005 – Dead Souls by Ian Rankin (UK, 1999)
- 2006 – The Librarian by Larry Beinhart (US, 2004)
- 2007 – Voices by Arnaldur Indriðason (Röddin, Iceland, 2003)
- 2008 – The Ice Princess by Camilla Läckberg (Isprinsessan, Sweden, 2002)
- 2009 – Priest by Ken Bruen (UK, 2006)

=== 2010s ===
- 2010 – Twilight by William Gay (US, 2006)
- 2011 – Limassol by Yishai Sarid (Israel, 2009)
- 2012 – The Devil All The Time by Donald Ray Pollock (US, 2011)
- 2013 – The Killer Is Dying by James Sallis (US, 2011)
- 2014 – The Cove by Ron Rash (US, 2012)
- 2015 – Un millón de gotas by Víctor del Árbol (Spain, 2014)
- 2016 – Perro muerto by Boris Quercia (Chile, 2015)
- 2017 – Sanning med modifikation by Sara Lövestam (Sweden, 2015)
- 2018 – No Tomorrow by Jake Hinkson (US, 2015)
- 2019 – Green Sun by Kent Anderson (US, 2018)

=== 2020s ===
- 2020 – Bearskin by James A. McLaughlin (US, 2018)
- 2021 – Crvena voda by Jurica Pavičić
- 2022 – American Predator by Maureen Callahan
- 2023 – Small Mercies by Dennis Lehane
