= Pierre Siniac =

Pierre Siniac (1928–2002) received the Grand Prix de Littérature Policière in 1981 for three of his works, including Aime le Maudit.

Ferdinaud Céline was published in French in 1997 to great acclaim. Translated to English by Jordan Stump, it was published under the title The Collaborators. Pierre Bayard discussed it in Comment parler des livres que l'on n'a pas lus? (How to Talk About Books You Haven't Read).

A story about the Paris Métro Line 8 inspired his novel Le Crime du dernier métro, published in 2001.
