= Charles-Hugues Le Febvre de Saint-Marc =

French playwright and intellectual

- Born: 22 June 1698; Paris
- Died: 20 November 1769 (aged 71); Paris
- Occupations: Playwright; Homme de lettres

Charles-Hugues Le Febvre de Saint-Marc (22 June 1698 – 20 November 1769) was an 18th-century French playwright and intellectual.

Saint-Marc is remembered for works of different genres, especially by editions of various authors such as the Mémoires by Feuquières, the Œuvres by Pavillon, Boileau, Chaulieu, etc., with notes and commentaries. In 1748, he wrote the libretto of an opera entitled le Pouvoir de l’Amour. He composed the 17th and 18th volumes and part of the 19th of the Pour et Contre by abbé Prévost.

He was a member of the Académie des belles-lettres, sciences et arts de La Rochelle.

== Sources ==
- A.-F.-F. Babault, Dictionnaire général des théâtres, t. 5, Paris, Babault, J. Capelle, Renaud Treuttel, Wurtz et Le Normant, 1810.
