= Histoire générale des voyages =

French book series

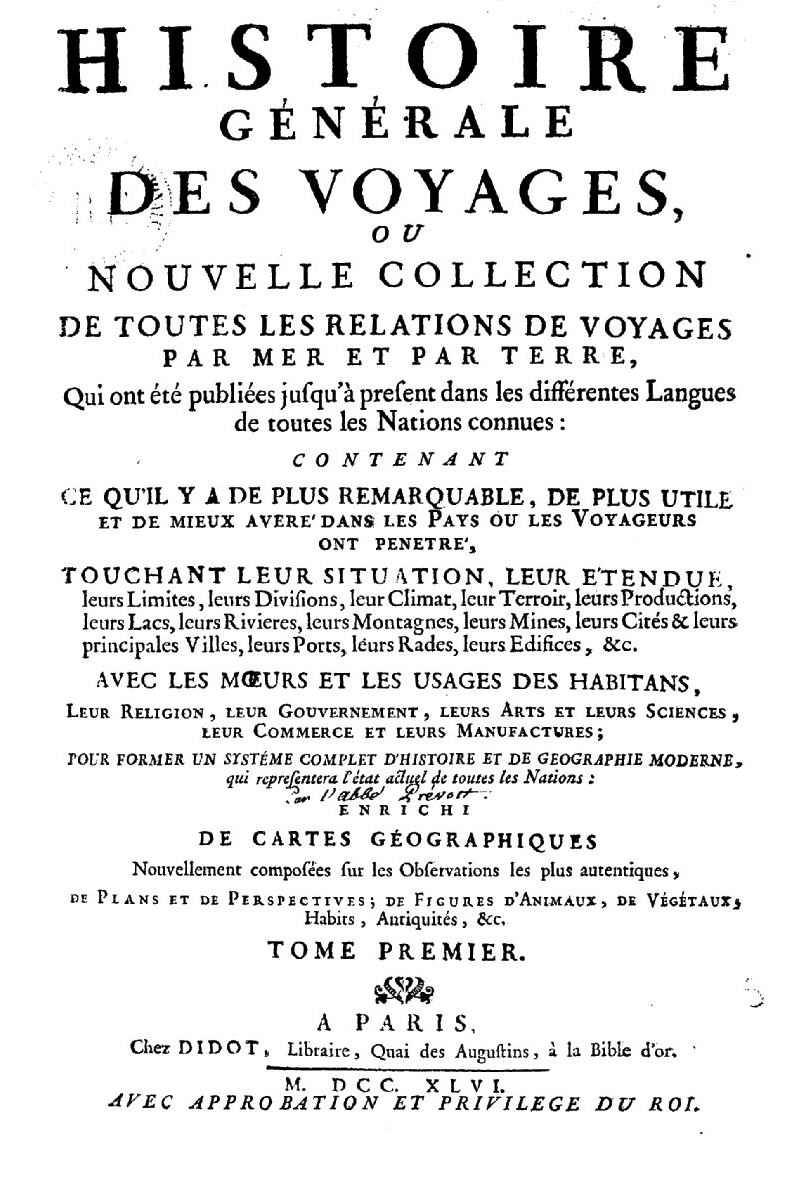
Histoire générale des voyages (title page of the first volume, Paris 1746)

Histoire générale des voyages ou Nouvelle collection de toutes les relations de voyages par mer et par terre, qui ont été publiées jusqu’à présent dans les différentes langues de toutes les nations connues (General History of Voyages, or New Collection of All Accounts of Sea and Land Travels Published So Far in the Different Languages of All Known Nations) is a 15-volume work by Abbé Prévost, published between 1746 and 1759. After his death, the number of volumes increased to 20. The collection describes the peoples, fauna, customs, geography, populations, and architecture of all regions known at the time.

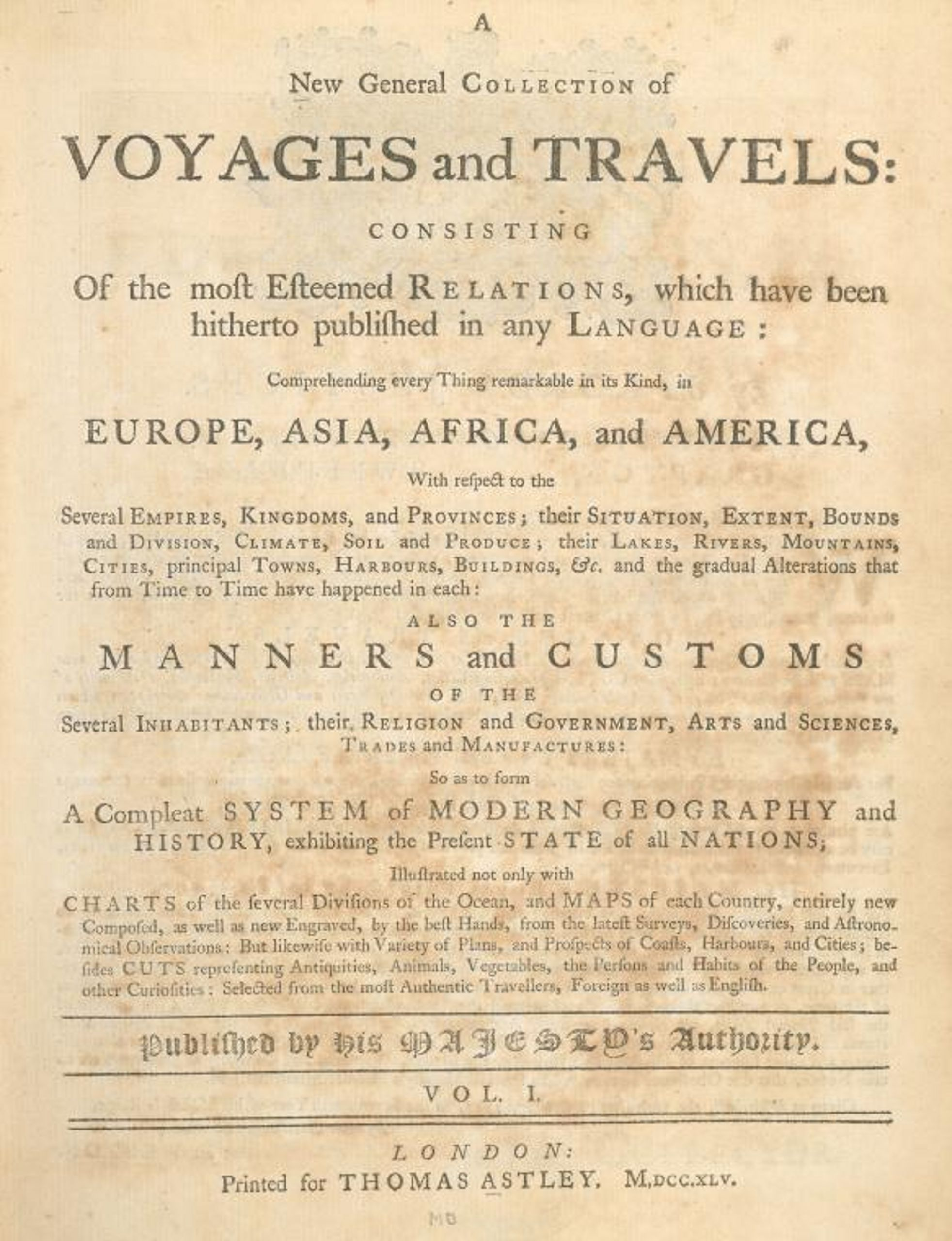
A New General Collection of Voyages and Travels, 1745 (title page)

Prévost translated John Green's A New General Collection of Voyages and Travels, known as the Astley collection, but substantially revised and expanded it. He reworked the content, added new material, removed unnecessary passages, had the illustrations re-engraved, and included additional narratives and notes.

The series was highly successful after publication, received royal patronage, and spread to other countries.

== Overview ==
- Voyages around Africa and to the East Indies (Volumes I–V)
- Voyages in Asia (Volumes V–VIII)
- Voyages of the Dutch and the French to the East Indies (Volumes VIII–IX)
- Voyages in Hindustan, Japan, the Philippines, and Borneo (Volumes X–XI)
- Voyages in America (Volumes XII–XV)
- Voyages to the Caribbean (Volume XV)
- Index and catalogue of maps and engravings, by Nicolas Maurice Chompré (Volume XVI)
- Supplement: restorations from the Holland edition; supplements (Volume XVII)
- Continuation, by de Querlon, Alexandre Deleyre, and Rousselot de Surgy: Iceland, Jan Mayen, Novaya Zemlya, Kamchatka, and Siberia (Volume XVIII); Greenland, Kamchatka, Swedish Lapland (Volume XIX); voyage around the world, voyages in the South Seas, voyages of Cook (Volume XX)

Voyage	Didot			De Hondt			
Detailed Table of Contents by Chapter						e-rara.ch	
Préface, Avertissement, Introduction	I	1746	Gallica	I	1747	e-rara.ch	
Premier voyage des Portugais aux Indes Orientales	I	1746	Gallica	I	1747	e-rara.ch	
Premiers voyages des Anglais en Guinée et aux Indes Orientales	I	1746	Gallica	I	1747	e-rara.ch	
Premiers voyages des Anglais aux Indes Orientales, entrepris par une compagnie de marchands	I II	1746	Gallica Gallica	II	1747	e-rara.ch	
Voyage en différentes parties de l'Afrique et dans les Îles adjacentes	II	1746	Gallica	III	1747	e-rara.ch	
Voyages au long de la côte occidentale d'Afrique, depuis le Cap-Blanco jusqu'à Sierra-Leona	II	1746	Gallica	III	1747	e-rara.ch	
Voyages au long des côtes occidentales d'Afrique, depuis le Cap-Blanco jusqu'à Sierra-Leona.	III	1747	Gallica	IV	1747	e-rara.ch	
Voyages en Guinée, à Bénin, et sur toute la côte, depuis Sierra-Leona jusqu'au Cap de Lope-Consalvo	III	1747	Gallica	IV	1747	e-rara.ch	
Description de la Guinée, contenant la géographie et l'histoire naturelle et civile du pays	III IV	1747	Gallica Gallica	V	1748	e-rara.ch	
Description des côtes, depuis Rio da Volta jusqu'au Cap Lope Consalvo	IV	1747	Gallica	V	1748	e-rara.ch	
Voyages dans la Guinée et au royaume de Bénin	IV	1747		Gallica	VI	1748	e-rara.ch
Voyages dans les royaumes de Congo et d'Angola	IV	1747		Gallica	VI	1748	e-rara.ch
Description des royaumes de Loango, de Congo, d'Angola, de Benguela, et des pays voisins.	IV V	1747 1748	Gallica Gallica	e-rara.ch	VI	1748	
Description des pays qui bordent la côte orientale d'Afrique, depuis le Cap de Bonne-Espérance jusqu'au Cap de Guardafu	V	1748	Gallica	e-rara.ch	VI	1748	
Voyages dans l'empire de la Chine.	V	1748	Gallica	VII VIII	1749	e-rara.ch	
Description de la Chine, contenant la géographie, et l'histoire civile et naturelle du pays	VI	1748	Gallica	VII VIII	1749	e-rara.ch	
Description de la Corée, de la Tartarie Orientale et du Tibet	VI VII	1748 1749	Gallica Gallica	VIII	1749	e-rara.ch	
Voyages dans la Tartarie, le Tibet, la Bukkarie, et à la Chine	VII VIII	1749 1750	Gallica Gallica	IX	1749	e-rara.ch	
Premiers voyages des Hollandais aux Indes Orientales	VIII	1750	Gallica	X	1753	e-rara.ch	
Voyages des Français aux Indes Orientales.	VIII IX	1750 1751	Gallica Gallica	XI XII	1755	e-rara.ch e-rara.ch	
Voyages dans la presqu'île en deçà du Gange / Voyages dans l'Indoustan	X	1751	Gallica	XIII	1755	e-rara.ch	
Voyages aux Indes Orientales par le sud-ouest.	XI	1753	Gallica	XIV XV	1756 1757	e-rara.ch e-rara.ch	
Voyages aux terres australes ou antarctiques	XI	1753	Gallica	XVI	1758	e-rara.ch	
Voyages errants, ou, sans terme fixe.	XI	1753	Gallica	XVI	1758	e-rara.ch	
Vies des gouverneurs généraux, avec l’abrégé de l'histoire des établissements hollandais aux Indes Orientales / Histoire naturelle des Indes Orientales	/	/	/	XVII	1763	e-rara.ch	
Voyages, découvertes, et établissements des européens en Amérique	XII	1754	Gallica	XVIII	1763	e-rara.ch	
Voyages, découvertes, et établissements des européens en Amérique	XIII	1756	Google.B	/	/	/	
Voyages, découvertes, et établissements des européens en Amérique	XIV	1758	Gallica	/	/	/	
Voyages, découvertes, et établissements des européens en Amérique	XV	1759	Gallica	/	/	/	
Voyages et établissements aux Antilles	XV	1759	Gallica	/	/	/	
Table des matières	XVI	1761	Gallica	/	/	/	
Catalogue des cartes, vues et plans	XVI	1761	Gallica	/	/	/	
Suite de l'Histoire des voyages, contenant les restitutions et additions de l'édition de Hollande	XVII	1761	Gallica	/	/	/	
Continuation de l'Histoire des voyages : Islande, Île Jean Mayen, Nouvelle-Zemble, Kamtchatka et Sibérie	XVIII	1768	Gallica	/	/	/	
Continuation de l'Histoire des voyages : Groenland, Kamtchatka, Laponie suédoise	XIX	1770	Gallica	/	/	/	
Continuation de l'Histoire des voyages : voyage autour du monde, voyages dans les mers du Sud, voyages de Cook	XX	An X (1801)	Gallica	/	/	/	

== Gallery ==
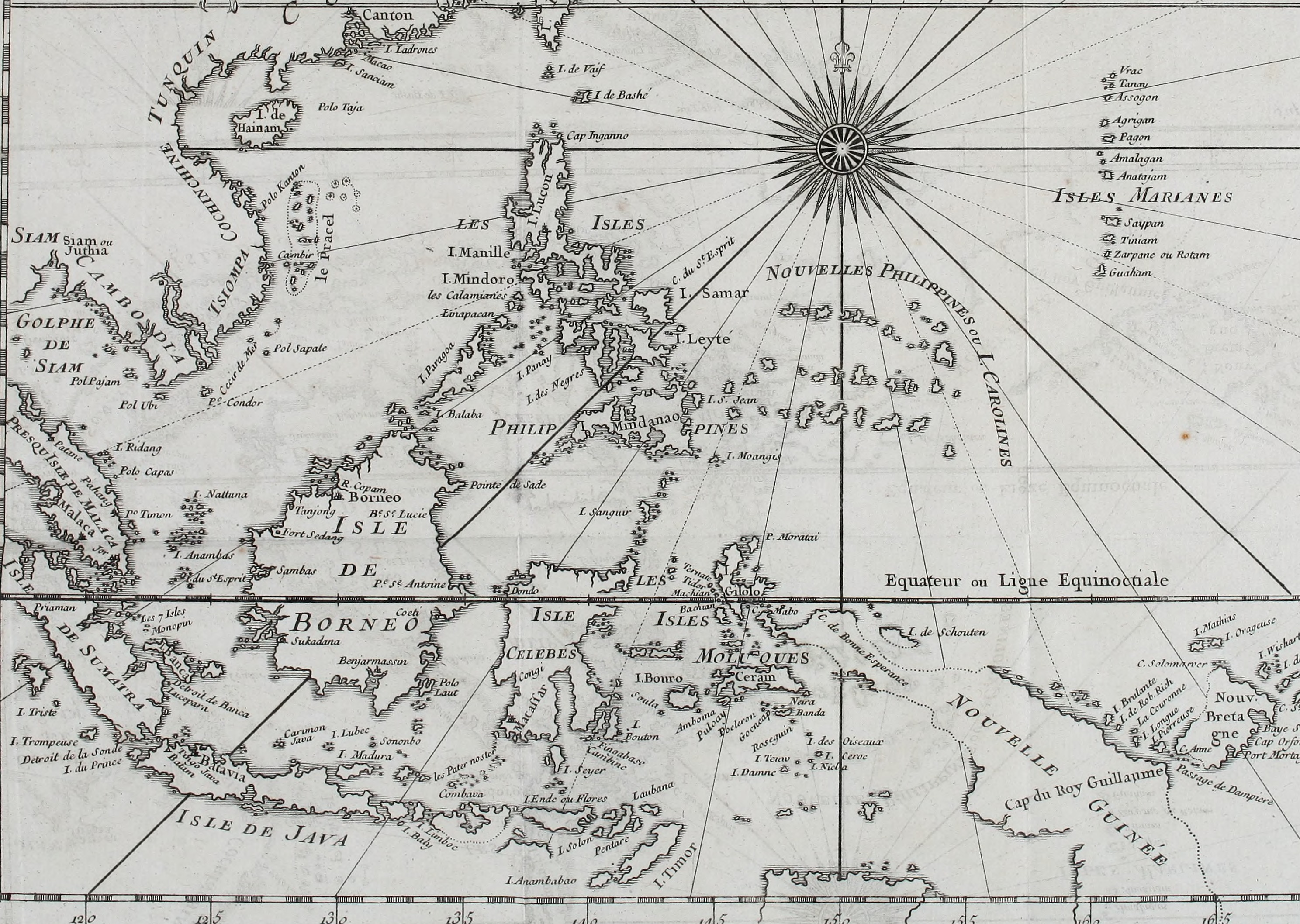
Map of Southeast Asia, showing the Paracel Islands near Vietnam. (le Paracel)

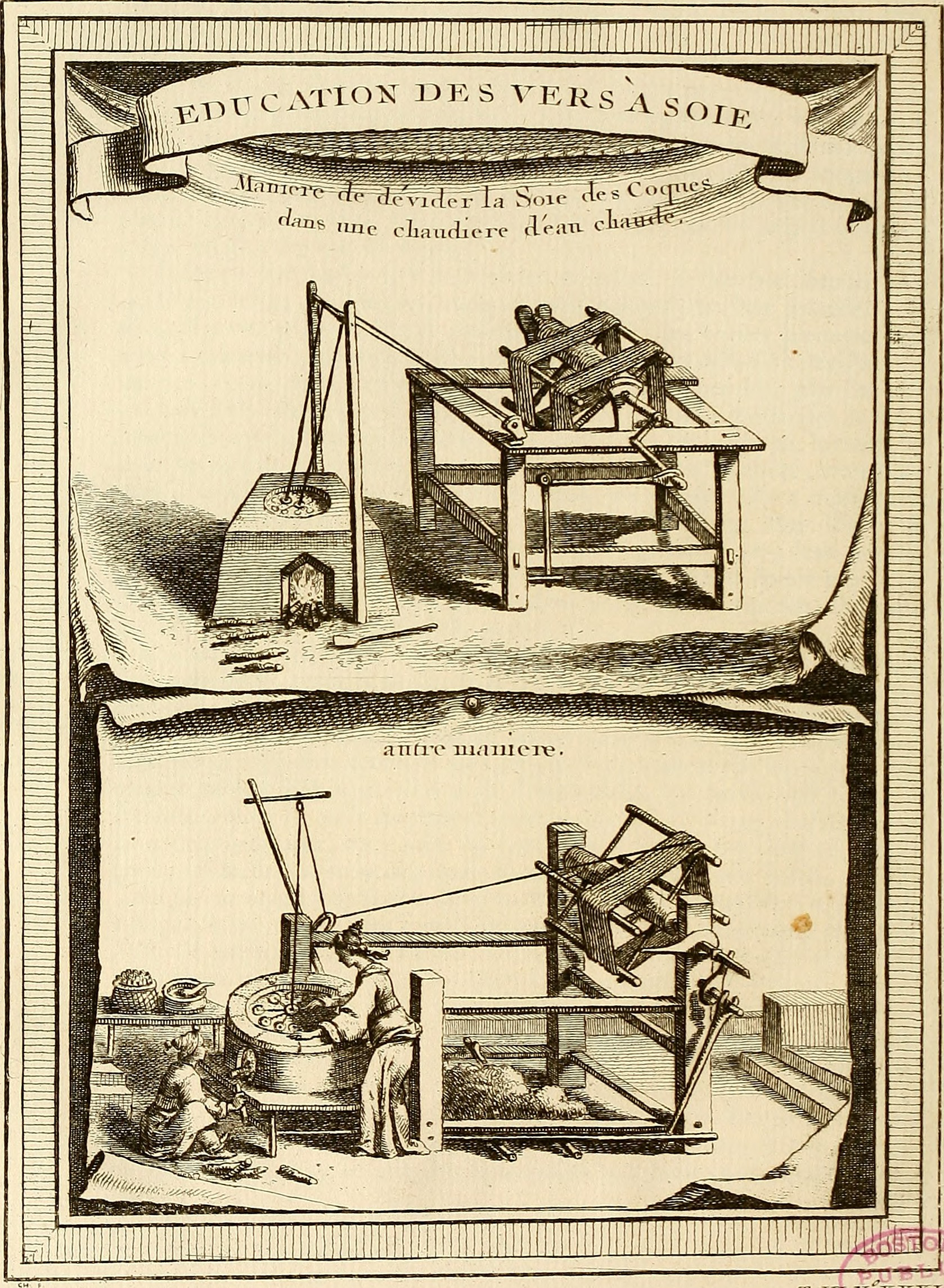
Silk weaving

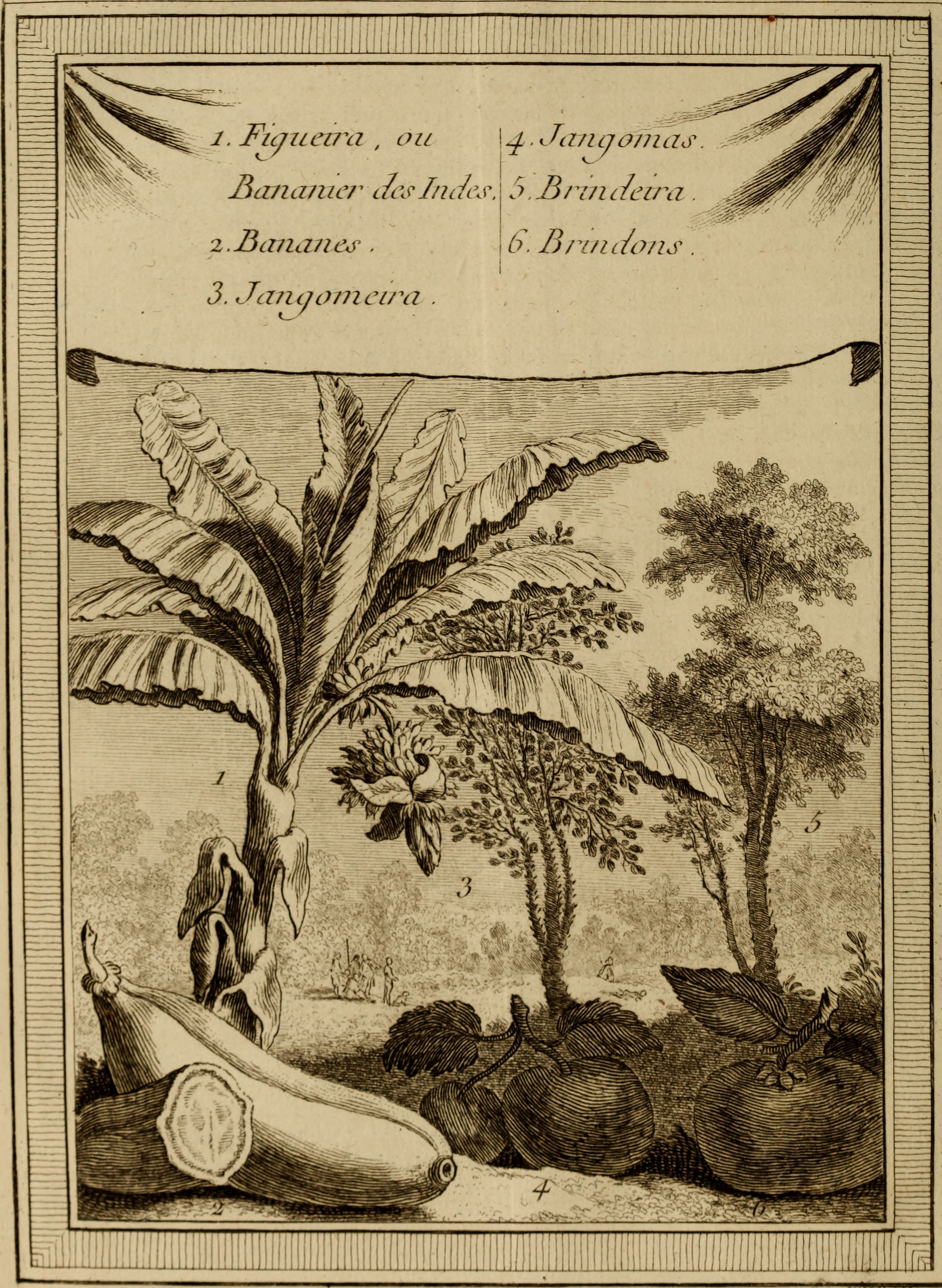
Fruits such as bananas and papayas

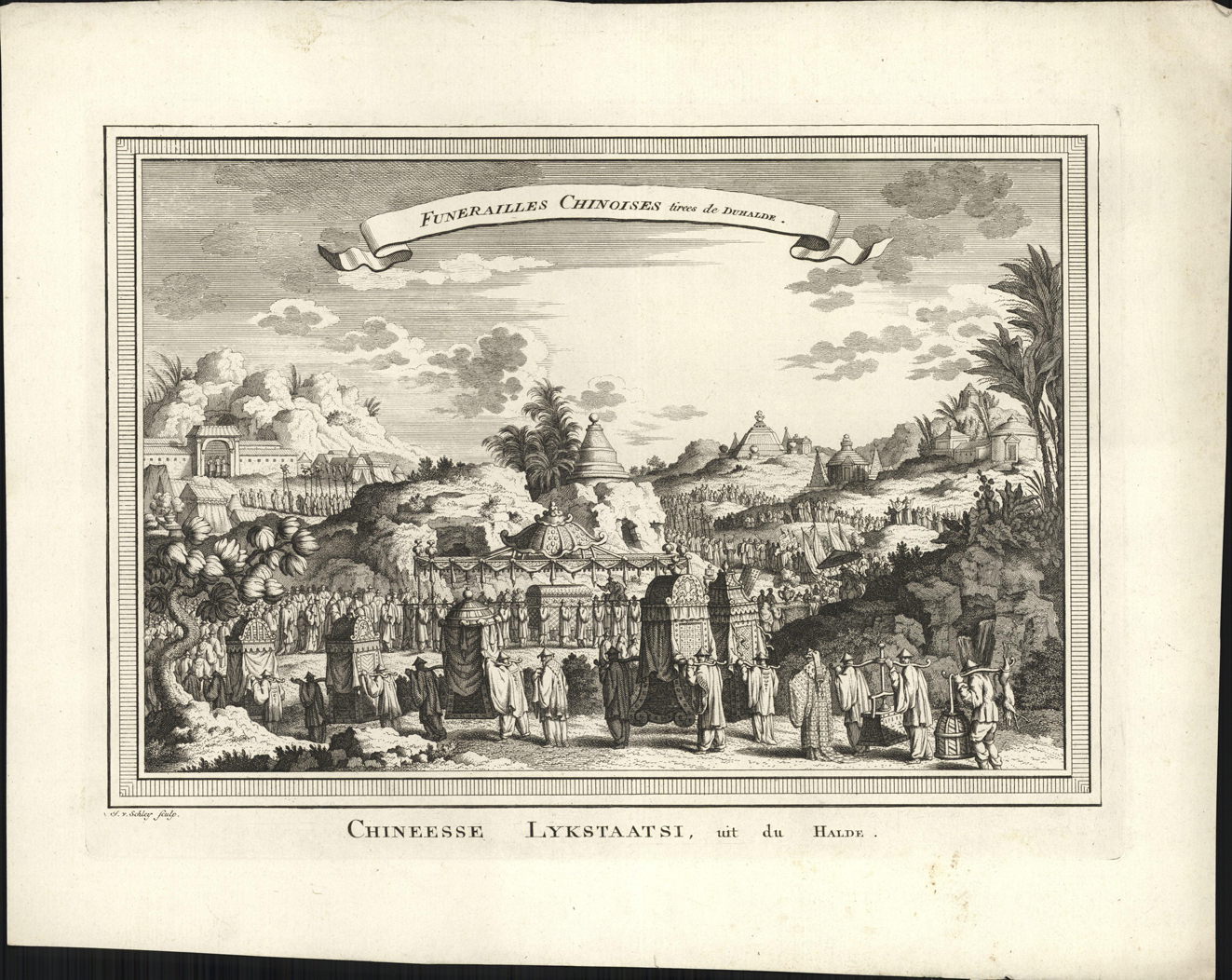
A Chinese funeral

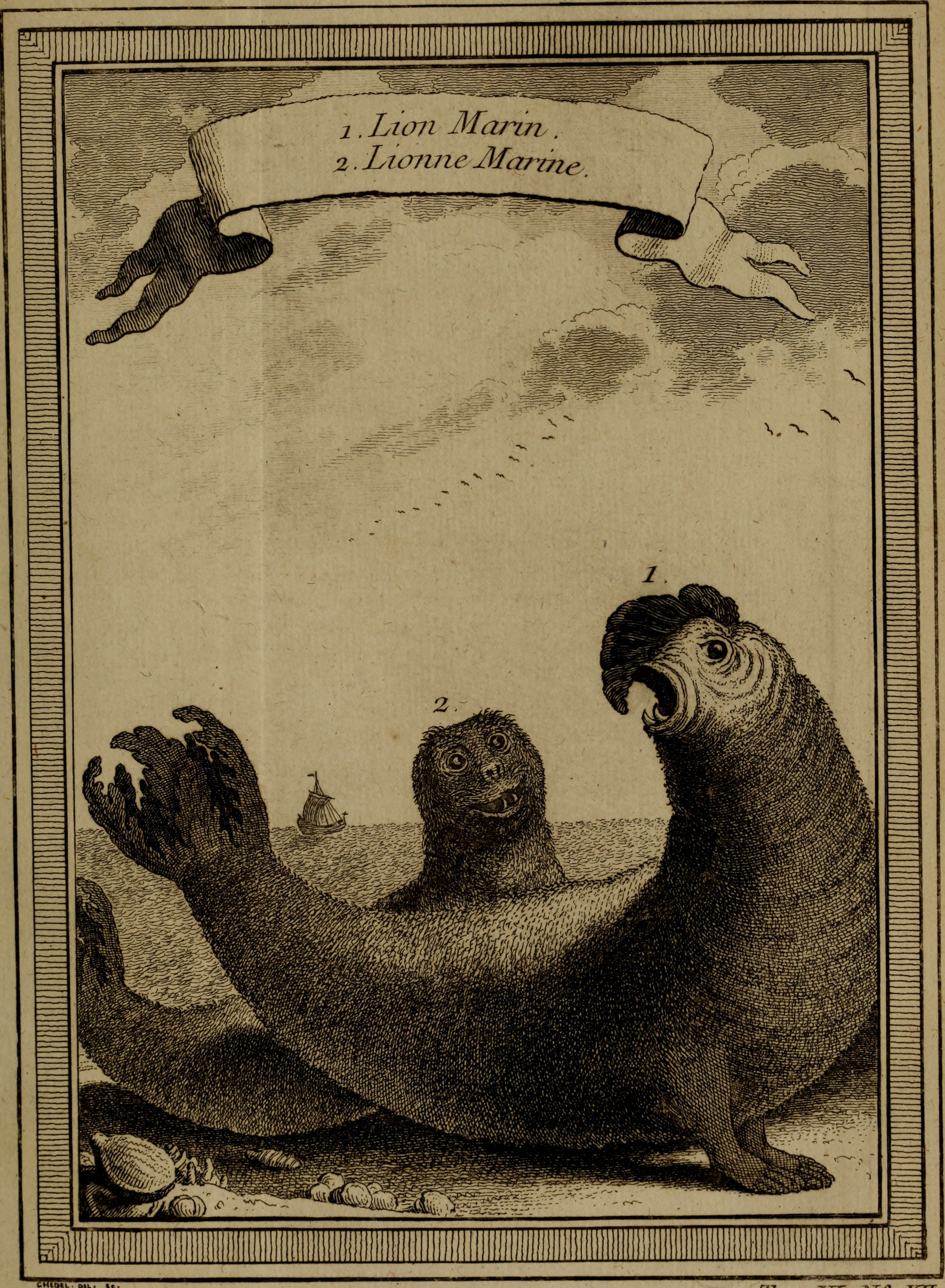
Male and female seals

== See also ==
- Contenu de l'édition originale chez Didot et de l'édition De Hondt (in French)
- Découverte de la terre : Histoire générale des grands voyages et des grands voyageurs (in French)
- Allgemeine Historie der Reisen zu Wasser und zu Lande (in German)
