= The Praying Mantises =

1960 novel by Hubert Monteilhet

- First US edition
- Author: Hubert Monteilhet
- Original title: Les Mantes religieuses
- Translator: Richard Howard
- Language: French
- Genre: Crime fiction
- Publisher: Simon & Schuster, Hamish Hamilton
- Publication date: 1960
- Publication place: France
- English publication date: 1962
- Media type: Print
- Awards: Grand Prix de Littérature Policière; Inner Sanctum Mystery Award

The Praying Mantises (also known as Praying Mantis in the UK) is a psychological suspense novel by Hubert Monteilhet, originally published in French as Les mantes religieuses in 1960. It received the 1960 Grand Prix de Littérature Policière and the 1962 Inner Sanctum Mystery Award.

The novel is notable for its use of epistolary form which is unusual in crime fiction. The story is told entirely through letters, diary entries, reports, newspaper articles, and tape transcripts.

== Plot ==
Paul Canova, a middle-aged university history professor, is married to the much younger Vera, a beautiful Russian émigré. Paul's first wife and their young son died under odd circumstances, and an insurance company launches a secret investigation into Vera's possible role in those deaths. Nevertheless, Canova seems content with his second marriage and has taken out a large life insurance policy designating Vera as beneficiary.

Then Vera accuses Canova's long-time secretary, Gertrude, of theft, and insists that Paul fire Gertrude. The secretary maintains her innocence and later commits suicide. Paul now needs a secretary, and his teaching assistant, Christian Magny, recommends one of his own students, Beatrice Manceau. While on the job, Beatrice has a brief affair with Canova but she soon ends it after Christian proposes to her.

Now married to Christian, Beatrice (who boasts of her powerful olfactory sense) smells another woman's perfume on her husband. She begins suspecting that he is secretly meeting with someone in their apartment while she is working with the professor. She hires private detectives who install a covert listening device that records all the conversations in the apartment when she is away. She finds out from the recorded tapes that Vera and Christian aren't just lovers but they are also plotting to murder Canova for his life insurance. As part of the plan Beatrice would also have to die. Beatrice places the incriminating tape in a safe deposit box and intends to use it as leverage against the adulterous plotters. She allows the murderers to proceed almost as planned, only to lure them into a clever trap and exact her own cruel revenge.

== English language editions ==
The novel has been translated into English twice: once by Richard Howard as The Praying Mantises for Simon & Schuster (New York, 1962, republished by Signet in 1963), and also by Tony White as Praying Mantis for Hamish Hamilton (London, 1962).

== Reception ==
The novel was the winner of the 1960 Grand Prix de Littérature Policière in France and received Simon & Schuster's Inner Sanctum Mystery Award for 1962.

Anthony Boucher writing for The New York Times Book Review called it "a lethally potent cocktail", "brilliant novel of murder, skillfully and economically conducted in the documentary method." Robert Kirsch wrote in The Los Angeles Times: "its emphasis is never on the violence… but rather on the terror of moral bankruptcy, the cruelty of the living, one to another." Sybille Bedford called it "a cool, swift, elegant, ruthless tale" and "the most originally handled modern detective story I have read". Phyllis McGinley said it was "a brilliant job...superbly plotted, leanly told, and as dry and cold as well-made martini." In The Spectator, Esther Howard deemed it "clever but distastefully vicious."

== Adaptation ==
1982: Praying Mantis, British TV film. A Portman Production for Channel 4, directed by Jack Gold, with Cherie Lunghi, Jonathan Pryce, Carmen Du Sautoy and Pinkas Braun. It aired in the U.S. on the PBS Mystery! series in early 1982.
