= Murder at the Frankfurt Book Fair =

1975 novel by Hubert Monteilhet

- First edition
- Author: Hubert Monteilhet
- Original title: Mourir à Francfort ou le Malentendu
- Translator: Barbara Bray
- Language: French
- Genre: Crime fiction, satire
- Publisher: Éditions Denoël, Doubleday
- Publication date: 1975
- Publication place: France
- English publication date: 1976
- Media type: Print

Murder at the Frankfurt Book Fair (also known as Dead Copy in the UK) is a satirical crime novel by Hubert Monteilhet, originally published in French as Mourir à Francfort ou le Malentendu in 1975. The narrative is presented as alternating entries in the diaries of the two protagonists, and the same event is often depicted from two contrasting points of view.

== Plot ==
Dominique Labattut-Largaud is a German literature professor at the Sorbonne who also writes pulp thrillers and historical adventures under assorted pen names. To his embarrassment, the professor’s secret life as a literary hack is discovered by Cecile Dubois, a young librarian, his former student and admirer. When he approaches her trying to protect his academic reputation, she mistakenly believes he is attracted to her, though he is a middle-aged married man with two children. Then Labattut-Largaud decides to get even with his boorish publisher Grouillot by plagiarizing an obscure 18th-century novel by Abbé Prévost. What started as a practical joke, however, quickly gets out of control. Labattut-Largaud's book, titled Equivocations, becomes a runaway bestseller and wins a prestigious literary prize, which makes the unscrupulous publisher even happier. The fraud is discovered by Cecile who is righteously outraged. Desperate to prevent her from causing a scandal, Labattut-Largaud begins a reluctant affair with Cecile, which culminates in a fatal confrontation at the Frankfurt Book Fair.

== English language editions ==
The novel was published by Doubleday in the United States in 1976. The UK edition, titled Dead Copy: Murder at the Frankfurt Book Fair, was published the same year by TBS The Book Service Ltd.

== Reception ==
The New York Times called it "a caper that has a sharp cutting edge", “terribly witty and lighthearted” and “altogether a superior piece of work: sophisticated, mad in its way, and full of all too recognizable types.” The Times Literary Supplement called it "an entertaining thriller of intrigues set in the world of international publishing."
