= Hubert Monteilhet =

French writer (1928–2019)

- Born: 10 July 1928; Paris, France
- Died: 12 May 2019 (aged 90); Garlin, Pyrénées-Atlantiques, France
- Occupation: Writer
- Writing career
- Period: 1960–2015
- Genres: Crime fiction, Historical fiction, essay, polemic

Hubert Monteilhet (July 10, 1928 - May 12, 2019) was a French writer of crime and historical fiction. His best-known novels are The Praying Mantises and Return from the Ashes which have been adapted into TV and motion pictures. His works are characterized by their literary sophistication and mordant wit while exploring moral and philosophical issues. He was called "one of the more eclectic and diversified dabblers in crime" and "the most literary of all the French crime novelists."

== Biography ==
Born to a family of a magistrate, Monteilhet was educated by the Jesuits at Saint-Louis-de-Gonzague, a private Catholic school in Paris. During the Occupation, he lived in Auvergne at the family estate in Nouara, near Ambert. He was tutored by Jean Recanati, a communist and future editor of L’Humanité, whom Monteilhet’s parents had taken in. After the war, Monteilhet received his degree in history at the Sorbonne. He first taught history in Normandy, and then at the Lycée Carnot in Tunisia from 1959 to 1970.

Monteilhet’s debut novel, The Praying Mantises, was an instant success. It became the winner of the 1960 Grand Prix de Littérature Policière in France and received Simon & Schuster's Inner Sanctum Mystery Award for 1962. In the crime novels that followed -- Return from the Ashes, The Road to Hell, Prisoner of Love and others — he established himself as a master of psychological suspense with a very personal style, showing great imagination in his choice of themes and plot twists.

In the 1976 novel Sophie ou les Galanteries exemplaires, for the first time, Monteilhet set his story in a distant past – the 18th century. In 1981, he briefly ventured into the science fiction genre with Les Queues de Kallinaos, both a philosophical tale in the style of Pierre Boulle and a tragedy of paternal love pushed to extremes.

Beginning from the 1980s, Monteilhet dedicated himself mostly to historical fiction. He covered a vast array of subjects: the Spanish Inquisition in Les Derniers Feux (1982), Emperor Nero’s Rome in Néropolis (1984), Joan of Arc in La Pucelle (1988), the times of Louis XIII and the Musketeers in De plume et d'épée (1999), and the French Revolution in Les Bouffons (2004).

He continued writing crime novels from time to time: Le Procès Filippi (1981), La Perte de Vue (1986), Arnaques (2006) and others.

For many years, Monteilhet was a food columnist for the regional newspaper Sud Ouest Dimanche.

He explored his gastronomic preoccupations in the witty crime thrillers La Part des anges (1992), Œdipe en Médoc (1993), Étoiles filantes (1994), and Le Taureau par les cornes (1994). His last novel, Une vengeance d'hiver, was published in 2012. In 2015, he also wrote the non-fiction book Intox : 1870-1914, la presse française en délire.

== Death ==
Monteilhet died on May 12, 2019, in Garlin, a small town in southwestern France, where he resided for many years. He was survived by his wife Geneviève, five children, 12 grandchildren, and seven great grandchildren.

== Writing style ==
Monteilhet’s early novels are written in the form of letters or diaries, or a combination of both, which is unusual for the crime genre. The writer returns to this technique in Murder at the Frankfurt Book Fair (1975) where the narrative is presented as alternating entries in the diaries of the two protagonists, and the same event is often depicted from two contrasting points of view. Jean Tulard remarks that Monteilhet is "the only author, or almost the only one, who cares to write and use all the resources of literature: correspondence, personal diary, interior monologue, press clippings... to punctuate his narrative." He also calls Monteilhet "the most literary of all the French crime novelists."

Monteilhet occasionally makes himself a character in his novels. In A Perfect Crime or Two, he is a crime writer approached by an attractive lady seeking his advice on how to commit a perfect murder. He is also a minor character in Murder at Leisure and Murder at the Frankfurt Book Fair.

== Literary influences ==
Monteilhet was influenced by the French libertine writers of the 18th century. His first novel The Praying Mantises brought comparisons with Choderlos de Laclos’ Dangerous Liaisons, due to the use of the epistolary form, and the cruelty and amorality of the characters.

Jean Bourdier notes these classical influences in Monteilhet’s first three novels, saying that the elegance is there, and “the insolence too.” And just like in the 18th century, morality is present “under the graceful and deceptive mask of amorality.” Thus Monteilhet joins the great libertines “on their privileged ground.”

== Religion ==
Monteilhet was a devout Roman Catholic with traditionalist views. He rejected the reforms instituted by the Second Vatican Council and denounced them in the polemical essay Rome n'est plus dans Rome (“Rome is no longer in Rome”). He defended his literal interpretation of the Gospels in another essay, Ce que je crois, et pourquoi (“What I believe and why”).

== Works in English translation ==
- The Praying Mantises (original title: Les Mantes religieuses), (Simon & Schuster, New York, 1962), (Signet, New York, 1963); also published as Praying Mantis (Hamish Hamilton, London, 1962)
- Return from the Ashes (original title: Le Retour des cendres), (Simon & Schuster, 1963), (New American Library, New York, 1964), (Panther, London, 1966), also published as Phoenix from the Ashes (Hamish Hamilton, London, 1963)
- The Road to Hell (original title: Les Pavés du diable), (Simon & Schuster, 1964), (Chapman & Hall, London, 1965), (Panther, London, 1966)
- Prisoner of Love (original title: Le Forçat de l'amour), (Simon & Schuster, 1965), (Chapman & Hall, London, 1966), (Panther, London, 1967)
- Cupid’s Executioners (original title: Les Bourreaux de Cupidon), (Simon & Schuster, 1967), (Panther, London, 1970)
- The Cupidevil (original title: Le Cupidiable), (Simon & Schuster, 1970), (Hodder & Stoughton, London, 1971)
- Andromache, or Inadvertent Murder (original title: Andromac ou le Meurtre par inadvertance), (Simon & Schuster, 1970), (Hodder & Stoughton, London, 1971)
- A Perfect Crime or Two (original title: De quelques crimes parfaits : divertissement criminel), (Simon & Schuster, 1970), (Hodder & Stoughton, London, 1971)
- Murder at Leisure (original title: Meurtre à loisir), (Simon & Schuster, New York, 1971), (Hodder & Stoughton, London, 1972)
- Murder at the Frankfurt Book Fair (original title: Mourir à Francfort ou le Malentendu), (Doubleday, Garden City, N.Y., 1976); also published as Dead Copy (Book Service Limited, 1976)
- Neropolis: a novel of life in Nero's Rome, (Viking, Harmondsworth, 1988) (Penguin Books, New York, 1990)

== Film and TV adaptations ==
- 1965: Return from the Ashes, British film directed by J. Lee Thompson.
- 1972 : Dr. Popaul, French film directed by Claude Chabrol, based on Murder at Leisure.
- 1982 : Le Retour d'Élisabeth Wolff, French TV film directed by Josée Dayan, based on Return from the Ashes.
- 1982 : Praying Mantis, British TV film directed by Jack Gold, based on The Praying Mantises.
- 2014 : Phoenix, German film directed by Christian Petzold, based on Return from the Ashes

== In the works of others ==
French writer Alain Demouzon offers a pastiche of Monteilhet’s style in his novel Mes crimes imparfaits. The title itself is a pun on Monteilhet's De quelques crimes parfaits (published in English as A Perfect Crime or Two.)
