= Brigitte Aubert =

French writer of detective fiction

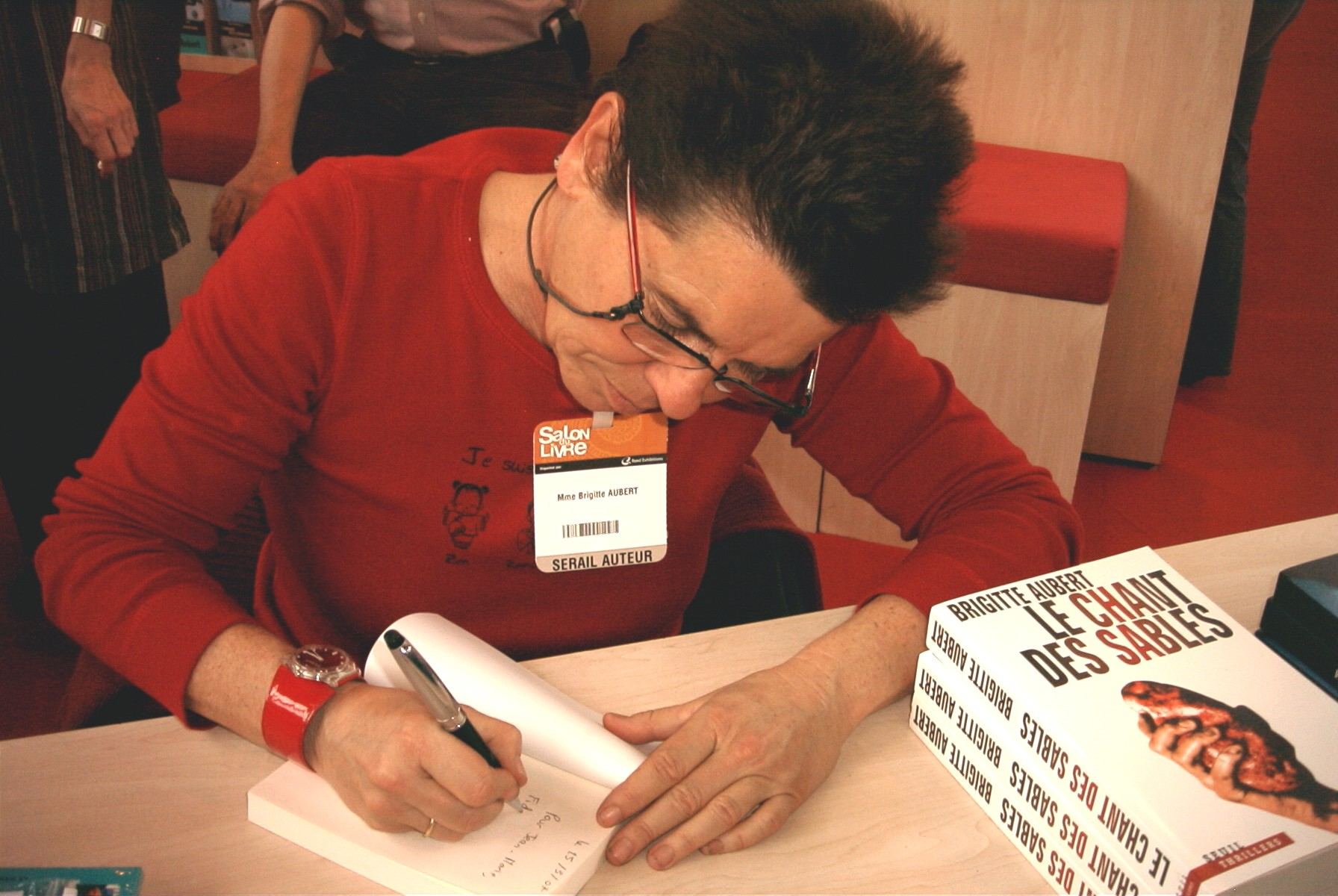
Brigitte Aubert at the Salon of Books in Paris

Brigitte Aubert (born in Cannes in March 1956) is a French writer of detective fiction. She has done some screenwriting and had works adapted for film.

== Novels ==
- 1992 : Les Quatre fils du Docteur March
- 1993 : La Rose de fer
- 1994 : Ténèbres sur Jacksonville
- 1996 : La Mort des bois (published in English as Death from the Woods)
- 1997 : Requiem Caraïbe
- 1998 : Transfixions
- 2000 : La Morsure des ténèbres
- 2000 : Éloge de la phobie
- 2000 : La Mort des neiges (published in English as Death from the Snows)
- 2000 : Le Couturier de la mort
- 2001 : Descentes d`organes
- 2002 : Funérarium (Seuil "Policiers")
- 2004 : Rapports brefs et étranges avec l'ombre d'un ange (Flammarion "Flammarion noir")
- 2005 : Le Chant des sables (Le Seuil "Thriller")
- 2005 : Nuits noires : recueil de nouvelles (Fayard "Fayard noir")
- 2006 : Une âme de trop (Seuil Policiers)

== Awards ==
- 1997 Grand Prix de Littérature Policière
