= Joel Townsley Rogers =

American writer (1896–1984)

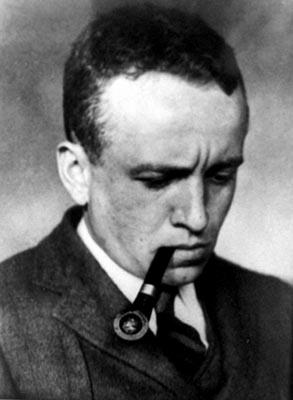
- Rogers at 26
- Born: Joel Townsley Rogers; 22 November 1896; Sedalia, Missouri
- Died: 1 October 1984 (aged 87); Washington, D.C.
- Occupations: Novelist; short story writer
- Spouse: Winifred Whitehouse (m. 1924)
- Children: 5
- Writing career
- Pen name: Roger Curly, J. R. Townsley
- Genres: Murder mystery; detective story; crime fiction; thriller; science fiction; nonfiction
- Notable work: The Red Right Hand
- Notable awards: Grand Prix de Littérature Policière, 1951

Joel Townsley Rogers (November 22, 1896 — October 1, 1984) was an American writer who wrote science fiction, air-adventure, and mystery stories and a handful of mystery novels. He is best known for his murder mystery The Red Right Hand, which is considered a cult classic of the genre and won the French literary award Grand Prix de Littérature Policière in 1951.

== Early life ==
Joel Townsley Rogers was born in 1896 in Sedalia, Missouri. He was interested in writing from his teenage years, and studied English at Harvard University. As the United States' entry into World War I was imminent in the late 1910s, he joined the U.S. Navy Air Corps and became one of its first few hundred flyers, training in Hampton Roads, Virginia. Although he had hoped to see action as a fighter pilot in World War I, the Armistice intervened, and he was sent to Pensacola, Florida, as a flight instructor instead. He eventually reached the rank of lieutenant (junior grade), and was released from active duty on August 15, 1919. After his time in the Navy, he attended graduate school at Princeton.

== Career ==
Rogers made use of his military experiences and vivid imagination to sell short stories to the many pulp magazines that sold in the 1920s and 1930s for fifteen or twenty cents. Notable for his versatility, Rogers was published in The Saturday Evening Post, Snappy Stories, Adventure, Argosy, Detective Fiction Weekly, Thrilling Wonder Stories, Saucy Stories, Telling Tales, Zest, Top-Notch Magazine and Startling Stories, among others.

He wrote in many genres, including westerns, adventure tales, fantasy, and science fiction, and made his first major success by using his experience as a naval flight instructor to write for the then-burgeoning market of aviation stories in the magazines Wings, Aces, and Air Stories, as well as many others in the pulp world. He began to write detective fiction in 1934, starting with the short novel Murder of the Dead Man in Detective Fiction Weekly. His short story “Hark! The Rattle!” was published in the debut issue of Weird Tales. New York Times mystery critic Anthony Boucher called him one of the leaders in the field of crime fiction in 1953. In another review, he called Rogers "one of those writers whose novels cannot be justly described", comparing him favorably with Cornell Woolrich.

=== The Red Right Hand ===
Rogers' most famous story is The Red Right Hand, first published in 1945 as a pulp novelette in New Detective Magazine, and later expanded to novel length and published by Simon & Schuster's Inner Sanctum mystery imprint. The story blends elements of 1920s-era mystery fiction, hard-boiled noir, psychological thrillers and horror fiction, and follows the possibly irrational Dr. Henry Riddle as he attempts to unravel the murder of young newlywed Inis St. Erme. The book sold fairly well and was reissued several times in paperback format. In 1951, the book won the Grand Prix de Littérature Policière International Prize, the most prestigious award for crime and detective fiction in France. Anthony Boucher, reviewing the novel in 1945 for the San Francisco Chronicle, praised it highly, calling it a book that "should appear with fair regularity on all future reading lists of the whodunit" and saying that Rogers "has taken the terrible tension of Woolrich-Irish, the fertile plot imagination of Keeler, the technical ingenuity of Christie and the stern deductions of Carr and a timeless twisted stream-of-consciousness narrative method of his own and produced something unique and exciting."

The book continues to be highly regarded by aficionados of the genre, and was reprinted in 2020 as part of Penzler Publishers' American Mystery Classics series, with a foreword by Joe R. Lansdale. Publishers Weekly gave it a starred review, praising its "virtuoso mix of terror and fair play" and saying that it "deserves its reputation as one of the best mysteries of all time." The novelette version was reprinted in 2007 by the publisher Ramble House. In his introduction to the 2020 edition, Lansdale praises Red Right Hand as "far more stylistically adventurous than most of the clue-on-clue novels of that era", and as a mystery that transcends its genre, operating as a stream-of-consciousness literary work in the spirit of William Faulkner, and presaging the later work of Jack Kerouac. Charles Ardai, writer and founder of mystery publisher Hard Case Crime, called it "a brilliant, borderline-insane stew of logic and illogic, Swiss-watch plot construction and bald-faced coincidence, and delicious, bone-cracking suspense." The Paris Review named it one of the magazine's favorite reads of 2020.

=== Other work ===
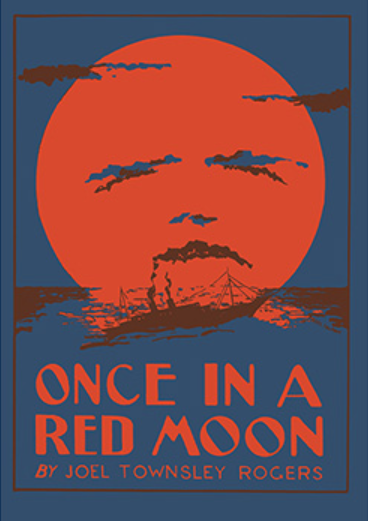
Cover of the 1923 novel Once in a Red Moon (publisher Brentano's)

Rogers' work, beyond The Red Right Hand, is not well-known today. Besides Red Right Hand, Rogers published hundreds of short stories and three other novels: Once in a Red Moon (1923), Lady With the Dice (1946), and The Stopped Clock (1958, reissued as Never Leave My Bed in 1963). His stories were anthologized in best-of collections in both the detective and science-fiction genres. His story "The Murderer" was adapted into an episode of the television series Star Tonight in 1955, starring Charles Aidman and Buster Crabbe.

1923's Once in a Red Moon was a satiric mystery novel. It received mixed reviews. The Dial stated that the book's satire lapses into "burlesque," but admired how Rogers "expands his rhetoric into bombast and his portraits into cartoons; he is a bit long-winded, but amusing and vigorous." The Bookman wrote that, "The author's probable intention was to write a satire on a certain type of modern fiction. Unfortunately the book strikes us as burlesque, and not a very good burlesque at that."

Anthony Boucher praised the flashback-heavy whodunit plotting of The Stopped Clock, calling it "twice as long as the average suspense novel, five times as intricate, and ten times as exciting."

== Personal life and death ==
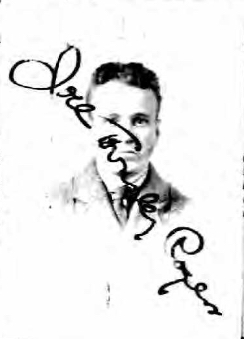
A passport photograph of Rogers, with his signature, from 1919

Rogers and Winifred Woodruff Whitehouse (May 7, 1902 — December 24, 1989) met on November 10, 1923, at a Harvard-Princeton football game. They were married on February 28, 1924, in New York; one of the witnesses was an editor of the pulp magazine Adventure. The couple moved to Washington, D.C., in 1947. She became a portrait painter, and died in 1989. They had 5 children.

In his later years, Rogers suffered several strokes and was forced to move to a nursing home in Washington, D.C., where he died on October 1, 1984, aged 87.

== Selected bibliography ==
=== Short stories ===
- "Hark! The Rattle!" (Weird Tales, 1923)
- "His Name Was Not Forgotten" (The Saturday Evening Post, 1943)
- "The Hanging Rope" (New Detective Magazine, 1946)
- "The Night the World Turned Over" (Startling Stories, 1952)

=== Novels ===
- Once in a Red Moon (1923)
- The Red Right Hand (1945)
- Lady With the Dice (1946)
- The Stopped Clock (1958)
