= Natale (surname) =

Natale is a surname. Notable people with the surname include:

- Andrea Natale, Italian-born American cardiologist and electrophysiologist
- Angelo Natale, former trade union leader and candidate for political office in Toronto, Ontario, Canada
- Anthony Natale (born 1967), deaf Canadian-born American actor
- Greg Natale (born 1974), Australian interior designer
- John Natale, American soccer coach
- Lou Natale (1950 – 2019), award-winning Canadian composer based in Toronto
- Patrick Natale (born 1968), American politician
- Ralph Natale (1935 – 2022), American mobster
- Roberto Natale (born 2003), Italian professional footballer
- Sonia Natale (born 1972), Argentine mathematician
- Stefano Natale (1903 – 1970), Italian long-distance runner

== Fictional characters ==
- Jimmy Natale, a Marvel Comics supervillain known as the Vulture

== See also ==
- Natale (disambiguation)
- Di Natale
