= Natale =

Natale may refer to:

- Natale, Botswana, village in Central District of Botswana
- Natale (given name), Italian given name
- Natale (surname), Italian surname
- Jimmy Natale, fictional character

== See also ==
- Buon Natale (disambiguation)
- Di Natale
