= Frank I. Marcus =

American cardiologist (1928–2022)

- Born: March 23, 1928; Haverstraw, New York, U.S.
- Died: December 21, 2022 (aged 94); Tucson, Arizona, U.S.
- Occupation: Cardiologist
- Known for: Emeritus Professor of Medicine, Section of Cardiology, Department of Medicine University of Arizona Health Sciences Center

Frank I. Marcus (March 23, 1928 – December 21, 2022) was an American cardiologist and Emeritus Professor of Medicine at the University of Arizona Health Sciences Center, the author of more than 290 publications in peer-reviewed medical journals and of 90 book chapters. He was considered a world expert on arrhythmogenic right ventricular cardiomyopathy (ARVC) and was a member of the Editorial/Scientific Board of 14 Cardiovascular Journals as well as a reviewer for 26 other medical publications.

== Biography ==
Marcus graduated from Columbia College, Columbia University, obtained a master's degree in Physiology from Tufts University, and received his M.D. from the Boston University School of Medicine, graduating cum laude in 1953. He did his internship and residency at the Peter Bent Brigham Hospital in Boston.

In September 2013, he was awarded a $1.4 million RO1 National Institutes of Health grant for a multi-center five-year study titled "Mechanisms, Genotypes and Clinical Phenotypes of Arrhythmogenic Cardiomyopathy." The study aims to analyze diagnosis of patients and family members with right ventricular and left ventricular cardiomyopathy.

Marcus died on December 21, 2022, at the age of 94.

== Awards and honors ==
- 2011 – Outstanding Achievement Award, European Cardiac Arrhythmia Society (ECAS)
- 2011 – Pioneer in Cardiac Pacing and Electrophysiology Award Heart Rhythm
- 2005 – Master Clinician of the AHA Council on Clinical Cardiology
- 2003 – Distinguished Alumnus Award, Boston University School of Medicine
- 1987 – Laureate Award, Arizona Chapter, American College of Physicians
- 1981 – Award of Excellence, Cardiology Section, University of Arizona College of Medicine
- 1960–1965 – Career Development Award, National Institutes of Health, -K3-HE-25-01
- 1960 – John and Mary Markle Scholar in Medical Science
- 1957 – Alpha Omega Alpha, Boston University chapter, Research Fellowship, Massachusetts Heart Association

== Memberships ==
- 1969–present – Association of University Cardiologists
- 1978–present – Fellow, American College of Cardiology
- 1982–present – North American Society of Pacing (NASPE)
- 1982–present – Member Correspondent Etranger
- 1988 – Societe Francaise de Cardiologie, Member, Advisory Board International
- 1995–present – Fellow, Council on Geriatric Cardiology
- 1999–present – Member, Scientific Advisory Board, CARE (Cardiac Arrhythmias Research and Education Foundation, Inc)
- 2005–present – the European Society of Cardiology
- 2005–present – Board Member: Folia Cardiologica

== Selected publications ==
- Marcus, FI (2012). "Diagnostic and therapeutic dilemmas with arrhythmic right ventricular cardiomyopathy". Card Electrophysiol Clin. 4 (2): 221–226. doi:10.1016/j.ccep.2012.02.013. PMID 26939819.
- Indik JH, Dallas WJ, Gear K, Tandri H, Bluemke DA, Marcus FI, and Moukabary, T. Right ventricular volume analysis by angiography in right ventricular cardiomyopathy. The International Journal of Cardiovascular Imaging, in press.
- Marcus, FI; Chugh, SS (2011). "Unexplained sudden cardiac death: An opportunity to identify hereditary cardiac arrhythmias". European Heart Journal. 32 (8): 931–3. doi:10.1093/eurheartj/ehq505. PMID 21239419.
- Corrado, D; Calkins, H; Link, MS; Leoni, L; Favale, S; Bevilacqua, M; Basso, C; Ward, D; Boriani, G; Ricci, R; Piccini, JP; Dalal, D; Santini, M; Buja, G; Iliceto, S; Estes, III; NAM; Wichter, T; Kamath, GS; Zareba, W; Delaney, J; Koneru, JN; McKeena, WJ; Gear, K; Polonsky, S; Sherill, D; Bluemke, D; Marcus, FI; Steinberg, JS (2011). "Value of the signal-averaged electrocardiogram in arrhythmogenic right ventricular cardiomyopathy/dysplasia". Heart Rhythm. 8 (2): 256–62. doi:10.1016/j.hrthm.2010.10.007. PMC 3077127. PMID 20933608.
- Marcus, FI; MD; Bluemke, DA; Calkins, H; Sorrell, VL (2011). "Cardiac magnetic resonance for risk stratification of patients with frequent premature ventricular contractions (Letter to the editor)". JACC. 57 (15): 1636–1637. doi:10.1016/j.jacc.2010.11.039. PMID 21474047.
- Moss, AJ; Francis, CW; Ryan, D (2011). "Collaborative Clinical Trials". NEJM. 364 (9): 789–794. doi:10.1056/nejmp1013194. PMID 21366470.
- McKenna, WJ; Thiene, G; Marcus, FI (2010). "Prophylactic implantable defibrillator in patients with arrhythmogenic right ventricular cardiomyopathy/dysplasia and no prior ventricular fibrillation or sustained ventricular tachycardia". Circulation. 122 (12): 1144–1152. doi:10.1161/circulationaha.109.913871. hdl:11380/1080477. PMID 20823389.
- Marcus, FI; McKenna, WJ; Sherrill, D; Basso, C; Bauce, B; Bluemke, DA; Calkins, H; Corrado, D; Cox, MGPJ; Daubert, JP; Fontaine, G; Gear, K; Hauer, R; Nava, A; Picard, MH; Protonotarios, N; Saffitz, R; Yoerger, DM; Steinberg, AS; Tandri, H; Thiene, G; Towbin, JA; Tsatsopoulou, A; Wichter, T; Zareba, W (2010). "Diagnosis of arrhythmogenic right ventricular cardiomyopathy/dysplasia (ARVC/D); Proposed modification of the Task Force Criteria (Circulation. 2010;121:1533-1541)". European Heart Journal. 31: 801–814.
- Marcus, FI; Basso, C; Gear, K; Sorrell (2010). "Pitfalls in the diagnosis of arrhythmogenic right ventricular cardiomyopathy/dysplasia". Am. J. Cardiol. 105 (7): 1036–1039. doi:10.1016/j.amjcard.2009.11.033. PMC 2860796. PMID 20346327.
- Bosnos, M; Guillen-Rodriguez, J; He, DS; Marcus, FI (2010). "Early Assessment of biophysical parameters predicts lesion formation during RF energy delivery in vitro". PACE. 33 (9): 1082–1088. doi:10.1111/j.1540-8159.2010.02799.x. PMID 20546148. S2CID 33190873.
- Marcus, FI; Zareba, W; Calkins, HG; Towbin, JA; Basso, C; Bluemke, D; Estes, M; Picard, M; Sanborn, DY; Thiene, G; Wichter, T; Cannon, D; Wilber, DJ; Scheinman, M; Duff, H; Daubert, J; Talajic, M; Krahn, A; Sweeney, M; Garan, H; Sakaguchi, S; Lerman, BB; Kerr, C; Kron, J; Steinberg, JS; Sherrill, D; Gear, K; Brown, M; Severski, P; Polonsky, S; McNitt, S (2009). "Arrhythmogenic right ventricular dysplasia/cardiomyopathy, clinical presentation and diagnostic evaluation: Results from the North American Multidisciplinary study". Heart Rhythm. 6 (7): 984–992. doi:10.1016/j.hrthm.2009.03.013. PMC 2735220. PMID 19560088.
- Marcus, FI (2009). "The ECG in right ventricular cardiomyopathy/dysplasia. How can the ECG Assist in understanding the pathological and functional changes in the heart in this disease?". J Electrocardiol. 42 (2): 136.e1–5. doi:10.1016/j.jelectrocard.2008.12.011. PMC 4329975. PMID 19193383.
- Marcus, FI. "Is the phenotypic expression of the Brugada Syndrome by the electrocardiogram different in men than in women?". J. Cardiovasc. Electrophysiol. 2008 (19): 1186–1187.
- Marcus, FI; Sorrell, V; Zanetti, J; Bosnos, M; Gear, K; Baweja, G; Perlick, D; Ott, P; Indik, JH; He, DS (2007). "Accelerometer-derived time intervals during various pacing modes in patients with biventricular pacemakers: Comparison with normals". PACE. 30 (12): 1476–1481. doi:10.1111/j.1540-8159.2007.00894.x. PMID 18070301. S2CID 25064745.
- Marcus, FI; Zareba, W (2007). "Evaluation of the normal values for Signal Averaged Electrocardiogram and Application of the Diagnosis of Arrhythmogenic Right Ventricular Dysplasia/Cardiomyopathy". J Cardiovasc Electrophysiol. 18 (2): 231–3. doi:10.1111/j.1540-8167.2006.00685.x. PMID 17338774. S2CID 9180074.
- Marcus, Frank I. (2002). "Update of arrhythmogenic right ventricular dysplasia". Cardiac Electrophysiology Review. 6 (1–2): 54–6. doi:10.1023/A:1017983004818. PMID 11984018.
- Marcus, Frank I. (2000). "Electrocardiographic features of inherited diseases that predispose to the development of cardiac arrhythmias, long QT syndrome, arrhythmogenic right ventricular cardiomyopathy/dysplasia, and brugada syndrome". Journal of Electrocardiology. 33 Suppl: 1–10. doi:10.1054/jelc.2000.20360. PMID 11265707.
- Search Results for author Marcus FI on PubMed.
