= Buon Natale (disambiguation) =

Buon Natale is a phrase meaning "Merry Christmas" or "Happy Christmas" in Italian.

It may also refer to:

- Buon Natale, a Christmas festival held in Thrissur, Kerala, India
- Buon Natale: The Christmas Album, a 2013 album by Italian operatic pop trio Il Volo
- Buon Natale... buon anno, a 1989 Italian film by Luigi Comencini
- "Buon Natale" (Citizen Smith), a 1980 television episode
- "Buon Natale (Means Merry Christmas to You)", a 1959 song most famously recorded by Nat King Cole
