= HomeMADE =

2009 Australian television series

homeMADE
- Genre: Reality
- Presented by: David Heimann
- Country of origin: Australia
- Original language: English
- No. of seasons: 1
- No. of episodes: 16

Production
- Executive producers: David Barbour and Julian Cress
- Running time: 60 minutes (including commercials)
- Production company: Cavalier Television

Original release
- Network: Nine Network
- Release: 10 May – 7 July 2009

homeMADE is an Australian reality television series that aired on the Nine Network. It premiered on 10 May 2009, and episodes aired twice weekly on Tuesdays at 7:30 pm and again at 9:30 pm. The series was presented by David Heimann, who also acted as a mentor to the contestants.

The concept of homeMADE was that two teams of emerging designers renovated two houses in five days, with one eventual winner receiving a prize of $100,000. The winner was announced on 7 July, as Jason from NSW. The designers were judged by Neale Whitaker, Editor-in-Chief of Belle, and interior stylist Sibella Court. Whitaker and Court are joined by guest judges, including Deborah Bibby, Paul Hecker, David Hicks and Greg Natale.

== Contestants ==
Contestant	Age	State	Status
Jason Sullivan	37	NSW	Winner
Darren Palmer	31	NSW	Runner-up
Chontelle Samios	23	NSW	Eliminated (Episode 14)
Richie Stevens	27	WA	Eliminated (Episode 14)
Leonie Edwards	27	WA	Eliminated (Episode 12)
Annie Vodicka	44	NSW	Eliminated (Episode 10)
Matt Derrick	34	Vic	Eliminated (Episode 8)
Stacey Kouros	26	NSW	Eliminated (Episode 6)
Matthew Simpson	36	SA	Eliminated (Episode 4)
Tonie Sauers	26	ACT	Eliminated (Episode 2)

== Episode ratings ==
Colour key:
– Highest rating during the series
– Lowest rating during the series

Episode		Airdate	Timeslot	Viewers (in millions)	Rank	Ref
1	"Series Premiere"	10 May 2009	Sunday 6:30–7:30 pm	1.021	#11	
2	"Elimination #1"	12 May 2009	Tuesday 7:30–8:30 pm	0.889	#22	
3	"Episode 3"	17 May 2009	Sunday 6:30–7:30 pm	1.002	#12	
4	"Elimination #2"	19 May 2009	Tuesday 7:30–8:30 pm	0.862	#21	
5	"Episode 5"	24 May 2009	Sunday 6:30–7:30 pm	0.975	#14	
6	"Elimination #3"	26 May 2009	Tuesday 7:30–8:30 pm	0.969	#18	
7	"Episode 7"	31 May 2009	Sunday 6:30–7:30 pm	0.958	#14	
8	"Elimination #4"	2 June 2009	Tuesday 7:30–8:30 pm	0.949	#19	
9	"Episode 9"	7 June 2009	Sunday 6:30–7:30 pm	0.967	#11	
10	"Elimination #5"	9 June 2009	Tuesday 7:30–8:30 pm	1.058	#16	
11	"Episode 11"	16 June 2009	Tuesday 7:30–8:30 pm	0.901	#18	
12	"Elimination #6"	16 June 2009	Tuesday 9:30–10:30 pm	0.720	#24	
13	"Episode 13"	23 June 2009	Tuesday 7:30–8:30 pm	0.831	#24	
14	"Double Elimination"	23 June 2009	Tuesday 9:30–10:30 pm	0.812	#25	
15	"Episode 15"	30 June 2009	Tuesday 7:30–8:30 pm	0.951	#17	
16	"Grand Finale"	7 July 2009	Tuesday 7:30–8:30 pm	0.900	#20	
