= Di Natale =

Di Natale, DiNatale or Dinatale is a surname of Italian origin which means "of Christmas". People with that name include:

- Antonio Di Natale (born 1977), Italian footballer
- Germana Di Natale (born 1974), Italian former professional tennis player
- Richard Di Natale (born 1970), Australian politician
- Stephen DiNatale (active 2016), U.S. politician in Massachusetts
- Jack Dinatale (born 1958), Australian rules footballer

== See also ==
- Natale (disambiguation)
- Natale (surname)
