= Andrea Natale =

American cardiologist and electrophysiologist

Andrea Natale is an Italian-born American cardiologist and electrophysiologist, i.e. a heart rhythm specialist. Natale is known for his work in atrial fibrillation ablation, and he is currently the executive director at the Texas Cardiac Arrhythmia Institute.

== Education ==
Natale received his medical degree from the University of Florence Medical School, Florence, Italy and later underwent specialist training in Cardiology at the Catholic University of the Sacred Heart in Rome. He then attended Methodist Hospital, Baylor College, Houston, Texas as a research fellow. Subsequently, he completed his Residency (Cardiology and Electrophysiology) at University of Western Ontario in Canada and University of Wisconsin, Milwaukee. Prior to his appointment as Executive Medical Director of the Texas Cardiovascular Arrhythmia Institute at St. David's Medical Center in Austin, Natale was faculty at Duke University, then Director of the Electrophysiology Section of the University of Kentucky in Lexington and Section Head for the Department of Cardiac Pacing and Electrophysiology and Medical Director for the Cleveland Clinic’s Center for Atrial Fibrillation.

== Career ==
Natale has been active in the Heart Rhythm Society since its inception, where he has been recognized as a Founders Member in 2004, at Chairman Level in 2005 and at Ambassador Level in 2010. He has been member of several HRS committees (Relation with Industry, Reimbursement and Regulatory Affairs, Atrial Fibrillation Consensus Statement ). From 2005 through 2008, he has been a member of the Annual Meeting Program Committee and since 2011 a Trustee in the HRS Board.

Natale is a faculty member at various universities and scientific and medical institutions, including Stanford University and Case Western University. He is the author, co-author or editor of hundreds of published articles and various books on pacing and electrophysiology. He serves or has served on the editorial boards of numerous medical journals including the Heart Rhythm Journal, Journal of the American College of Cardiology, American Journal of Cardiology, Journal of Cardiovascular Electrophysiology, American Heart Journal, Circulation, Journal of Electrocardiology and is the editor-in-chief of the Journal of Atrial Fibrillation. Besides Venice Arrhythmias, he is the creator of EPLIVE, the first fully interactive meeting of his genre, where EP experts from various countries are invited to share their experience while observing live cases being performed in the state-of-the-art laboratories of TCAI in Austin, Texas.

== Research and clinical achievements ==
Natale pioneered a circumferential ultrasound vein-ablation system to correct atrial fibrillation and performed the procedure on the world's first patients. He also developed some of the current catheter-based cure strategies for atrial fibrillation, and was the first electrophysiologist in the US to perform percutaneous epicardial radiofrequency ablation, which is a treatment for people who fail conventional ablation. He has authored milestone papers on pivotal projects, such as PABA and RAAFT.

== Appointments ==
Natale serves as the Executive Medical Director at Texas Cardiac Arrhythmia Institute at St. David’s Medical Center in Austin, Texas. Since 2007 he has been appointed Senior Director of the Arrhythmia Center at California Pacific Medical Center in San Francisco. In 2012 he also became Director of Interventional Electrophysiology at the Scripps Clinic in La Jolla, California, directed by Dr. Paul Tierstein and Dr. Eric Topol. Since April 2013 he is also Executive Director of the Al Sabah Arrhythmia institute at St Luke's -Roosevelt Medical Center, in New York. He is a member, in charge of new technologies, for the Task Force on Atrial Fibrillation

== Personal life ==
In September 2020, he claimed that his daughter was "attacked" by Black Lives Matter protesters while at a stop light in Baltimore. However, 9-1-1 emergency call recordings and police body camera footage indicated that squeegee boys offered to clean the daughter's car windows, and that her boyfriend engaged the teens in a physical and verbal assault after threatening them with a knife. Natale later doubled down on his claims before deleting his Twitter account and apologizing.

== Honors ==
Natale has received many awards for his clinical work and commitment to teaching, including the following:

- Cleveland Clinic Bakken Heart-Brain Institute Research Award
- Cleveland Clinic Innovator of the Year for 2004, 2005 and 2006
- Texas Cardiac Arrhythmia Institute: The Bury + Partners Innovation Award 2009. Austin, Texas.
