= Greg Natale =

Australian interior designer

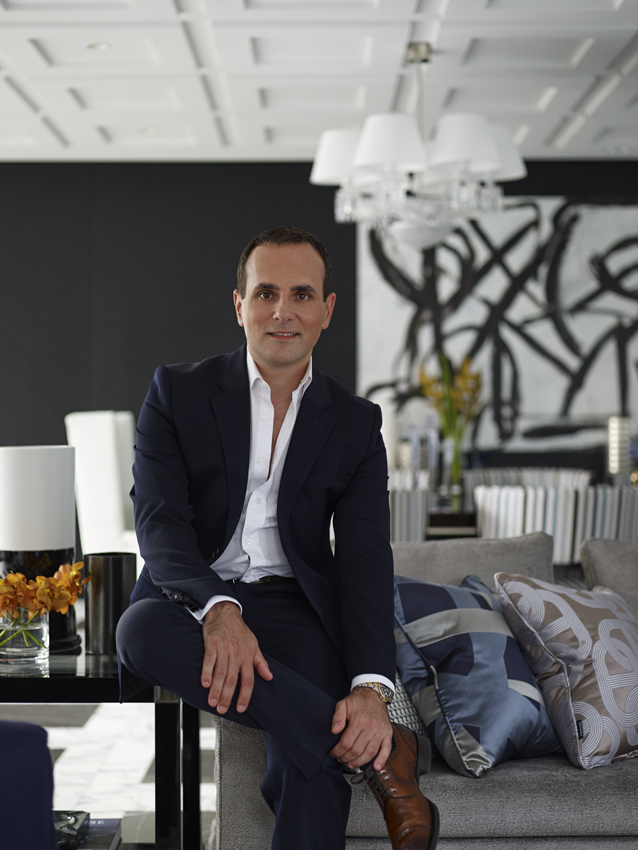
- Born: 1974 (age 51–52); Sydney, Australia
- Occupation: Interior designer
- Years active: 1996–present
- Website: gregnatale.com

Greg Natale (born 1974) is an Australian interior designer, and the founder of Greg Natale Design.

== Early life and education ==
Natale was born and raised in Sydney, Australia, to Italian immigrants who arrived in Australia in the 1950s. Natale took a three-year course in interior design at the Enmore Design Centre at TAFE NSW – Sydney Institute, studied visual arts at Sydney College of the Arts, and architecture at the University of Technology, Sydney.

== Career ==
From 1996 to 2001, Natale worked for three different architectural design firms: Garth Barnett Designers, HBO+EMTB, and SJB. In 2001, he launched Greg Natale Design. This was around the end of the minimalism movement, and Natale chose to pursue a more luxurious look than had previously been in style. His first major project was the 2002 design of the Gonano Apartment, with a decorative, repeat pattern coordinated on walls, blinds, bed linens and art.

Natale's first book, The Tailored Interior, was published by Hardie Grant in November 2014, with photography by Anson Smart and a foreword by Jonathan Adler. The book offers insights and lessons on interior design, including Natale's philosophies and approach to paint colour, type of paints, patterns, proportion, cohesion and layering, showcasing 18 spaces Natale has created. Architectural Digest named the book as part of its 21 Best Books by Designers and Architects of 2015.

In September 2018, Natale's second book, The Patterned Interior, was published by Rizzoli New York.

== Bibliography ==
- The Tailored Interior (Hardie Grant Books, 2014)
- The Patterned Interior (Rizzoli, New York, 2018)

== Television ==
- homeMADE, Nine Network, season 1, 2009
- The Renovators, Network Ten, season 1, 2011
