= Sonia Natale =

Argentine mathematician

Sonia Luján Natale (born 1972) is an Argentine mathematician specializing in abstract algebra. She works as a professor of mathematics at the National University of Córdoba, where she earned her Ph.D. in 1999, and as a researcher for the National Scientific and Technical Research Council.

Natale's dissertation, Semisimple Hopf Algebras, was supervised by Nicolás Andruskiewitsch. She is also the author of the monograph Semisolvability of Semisimple Hopf Algebras of Low Dimension (Memoirs of the American Mathematical Society 874, 2007).

In 2011, the Argentine Academia Nacional de Ciencias Exactas, Físicas y Naturales gave Natale their Pedro E. Zadunaisky Prize in Mathematics. In 2017, the Argentine government gave her their Houssay Prize in recognition of her research. She was an invited speaker on fusion algebras at the 2018 International Congress of Mathematicians.
