= Roberto Natale =

Italian footballer

Personal information
- Date of birth: 14 May 2003 (age 23)
- Place of birth: Naples, Italy
- Height: 1.86 m (6 ft 1 in)
- Position: Defensive midfielder

Team information
- Current team: Napoli

Youth career
- 2012–2014: ASD San Luciano
- 2014–2017: ASD Capua
- 2017–2021: Napoli

Senior career*
Years	Team	Apps	(Gls)
2021–	Napoli	0	(0)
2021–2022	→ US Viterbese (loan)	0	(0)
- * Club domestic league appearances and goals as of 13 June 2022

Roberto Natale (born 14 May 2003) is an Italian professional footballer who plays for Napoli.

== Club career ==
Roberto Natale made his professional debut for the Viterbese on 3 November 2021, along with teammate Simone D'Uffizi, during a 1–0 away Coppa Serie C win against Ancona.
