= Natale (given name) =

- Gender: Male

Other names
- Related names: Natalie

Natale is a male given name.

- Natale Hans Bellocchi (1926 – 2014), American industrial engineer
- Natale Bonifacio (1537/38 – 1592, in Šibenik), producer of engravings and woodcuts in Rome
- Natale Borsano
- Natale Capellaro (1902 – 1977), Italian mechanical designer of mechanical calculators and honoris causa engineer
- Natale Colla
- Natale D'Amico
- Natale Evola (1907 –1973), New York mobster
- Natale Galletta
- Natale Gonnella (born 1976), Italian retired footballer
- Natale Iamonte (1927 – 2015), Italian criminal and a historical boss of the 'Ndrangheta
- Natale Monferrato (1603–1685), Italian baroque composer
- Natale Masuccio (between 1561 and 1568 – 1619), Italian architect and Jesuit
- Natale Mussini
- Natale Rauty
- Natale Schiavoni (1777 – 1858), Italian painter and engraver
