= Buon Natale =

Annual Christmas procession in Thrissur, Kerala, India

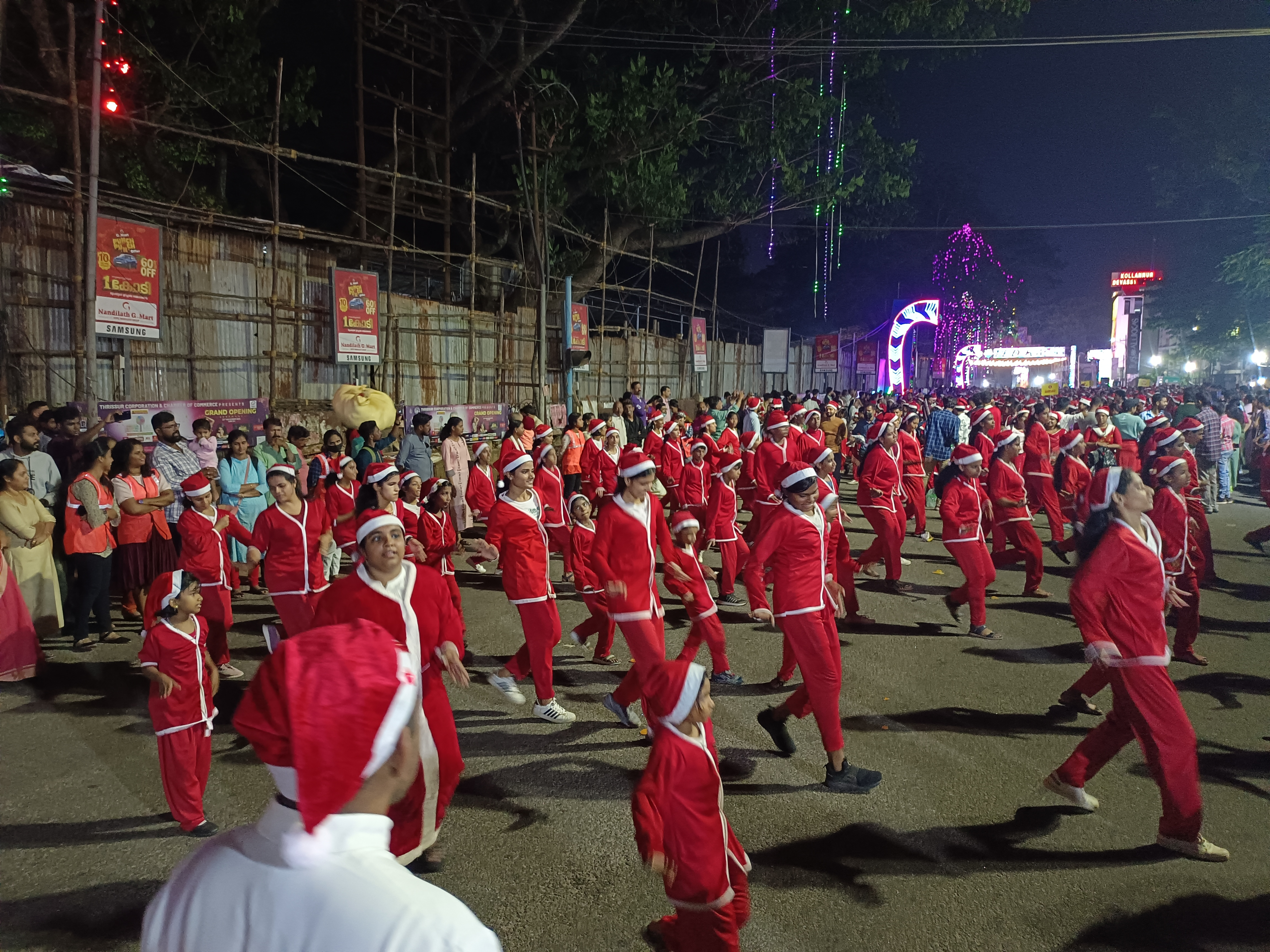
- Genre: Cultural festival
- Dates: December–January
- Locations: Thrissur, Kerala, India
- Years active: 2013 – present
- Next event: 27 December 2025

Buon Natale (from the Italian phrase meaning "Merry Christmas"; Malayalam: ബോൺ നത്താലെ) is the cultural festival organized by the Thrissur Archdiocese and Thrissur Citizenry in association with Christmas celebration. It is held at the premises of Thrissur city in Kerala every year from 2013. Buon Natale procession entered the Guinness World Records in 2014 for having the maximum number of people dressed up as Santa Claus. This event was started to raise charitable funds along with the celebrations.

== History ==
The Buon Natale was first conducted by the Thrissur Archdiocese in 2013. This was flagged of by former president of India, A.P.J. Abdul Kalam. 5,000 Santa Clauses and 2,000 angels was part of this cultural event. On 27 December 2014 this event had the participation of 18,112 number Santa Clauses and won the Guinness World Records. Due to COVID-19 pandemic there were no celebrations in the year 2020 and 2021.

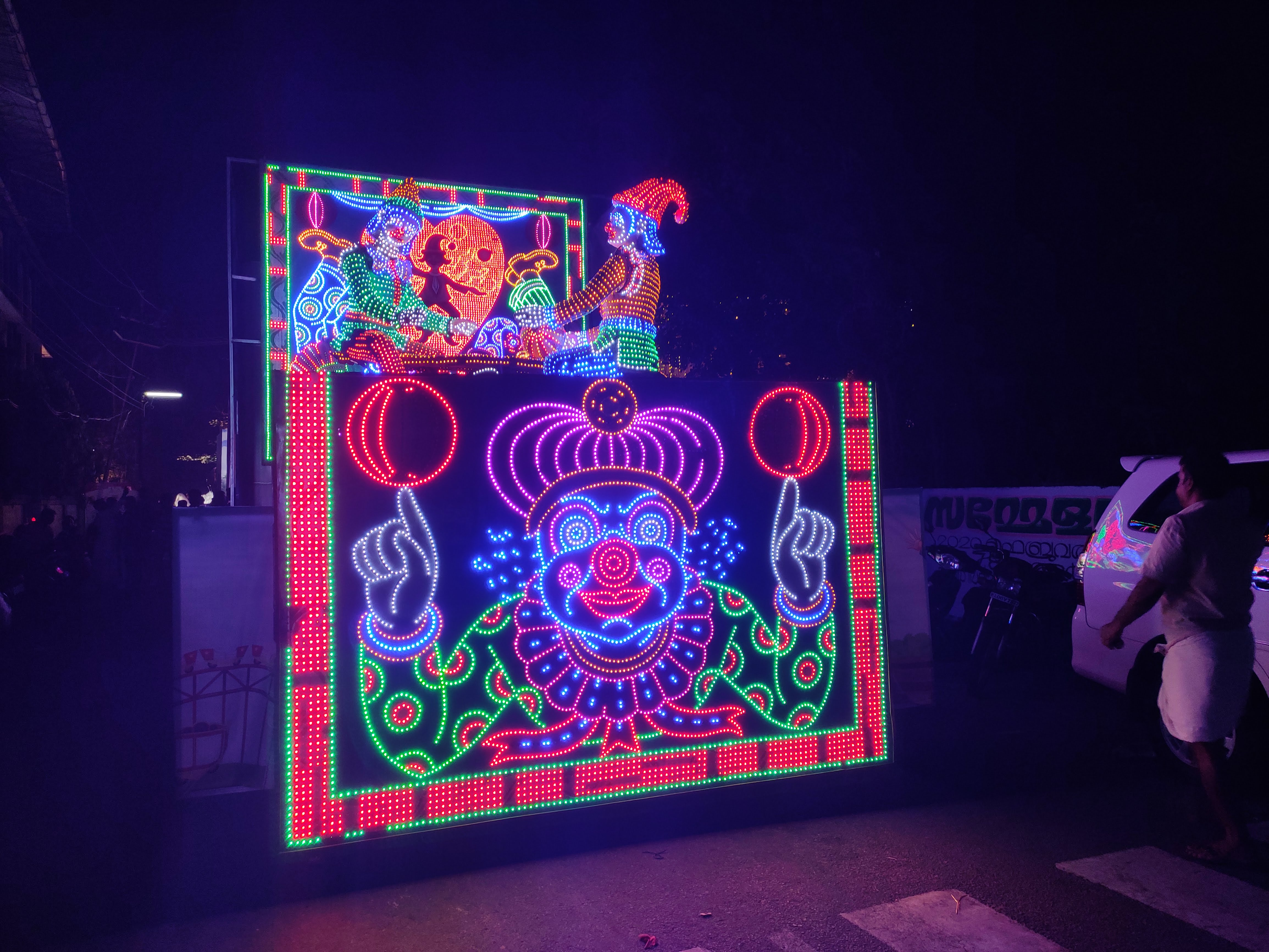
PLot at Buon Natale 2019 procession

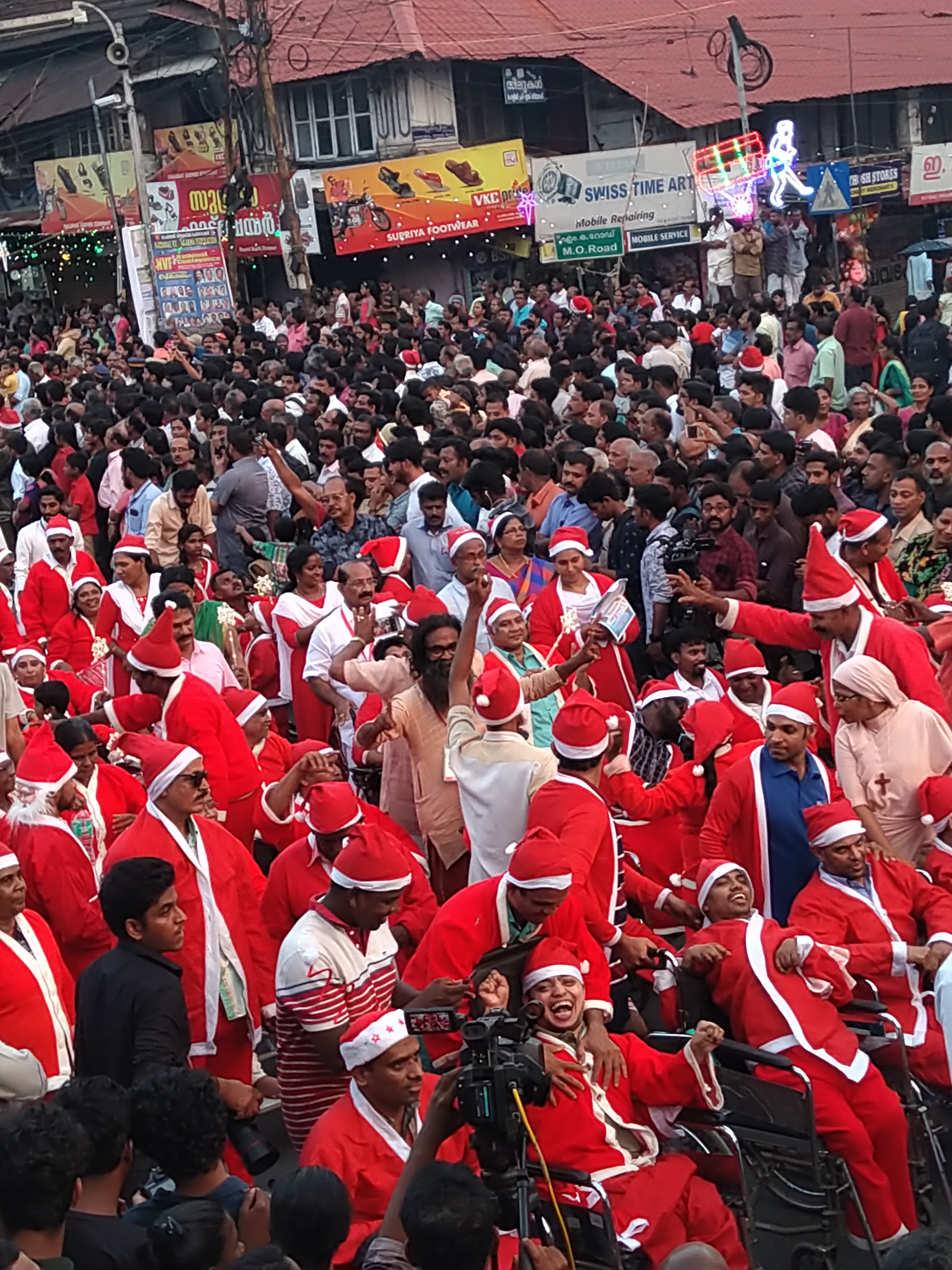
Santas walking during Buon Natale 2019

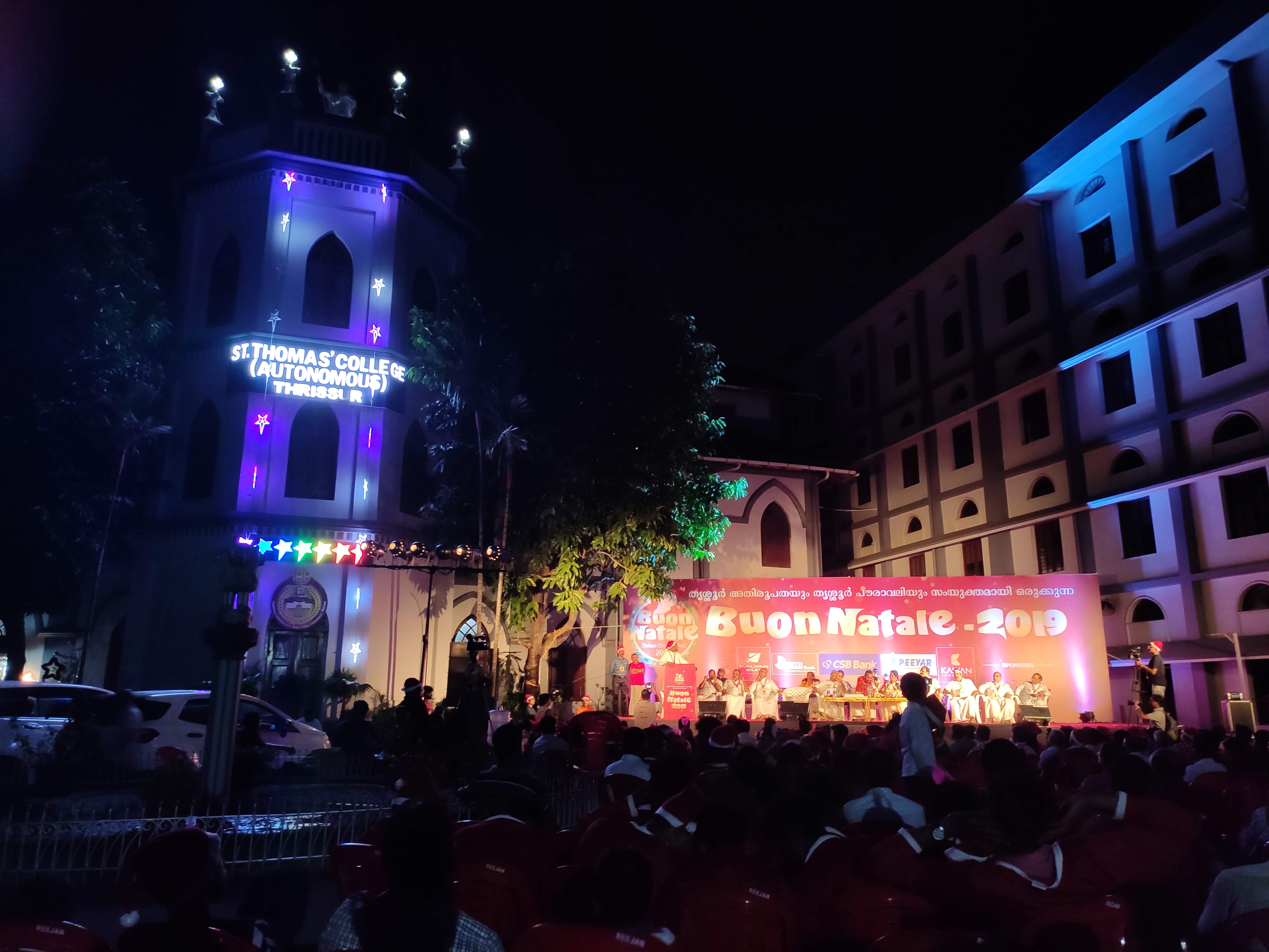
Buon Natale procession closing ceremony 2019

=== 2022 ===
The 10th edition of Buon Natale was held on 27 December 2022. The procession started from St. Thomas College, Thrissur and goes round through the Swaraj Round, Thrissur. The Union Minister of State for Minority Affairs, John Barla was the chief guest of the 2022nd Buon Natale.

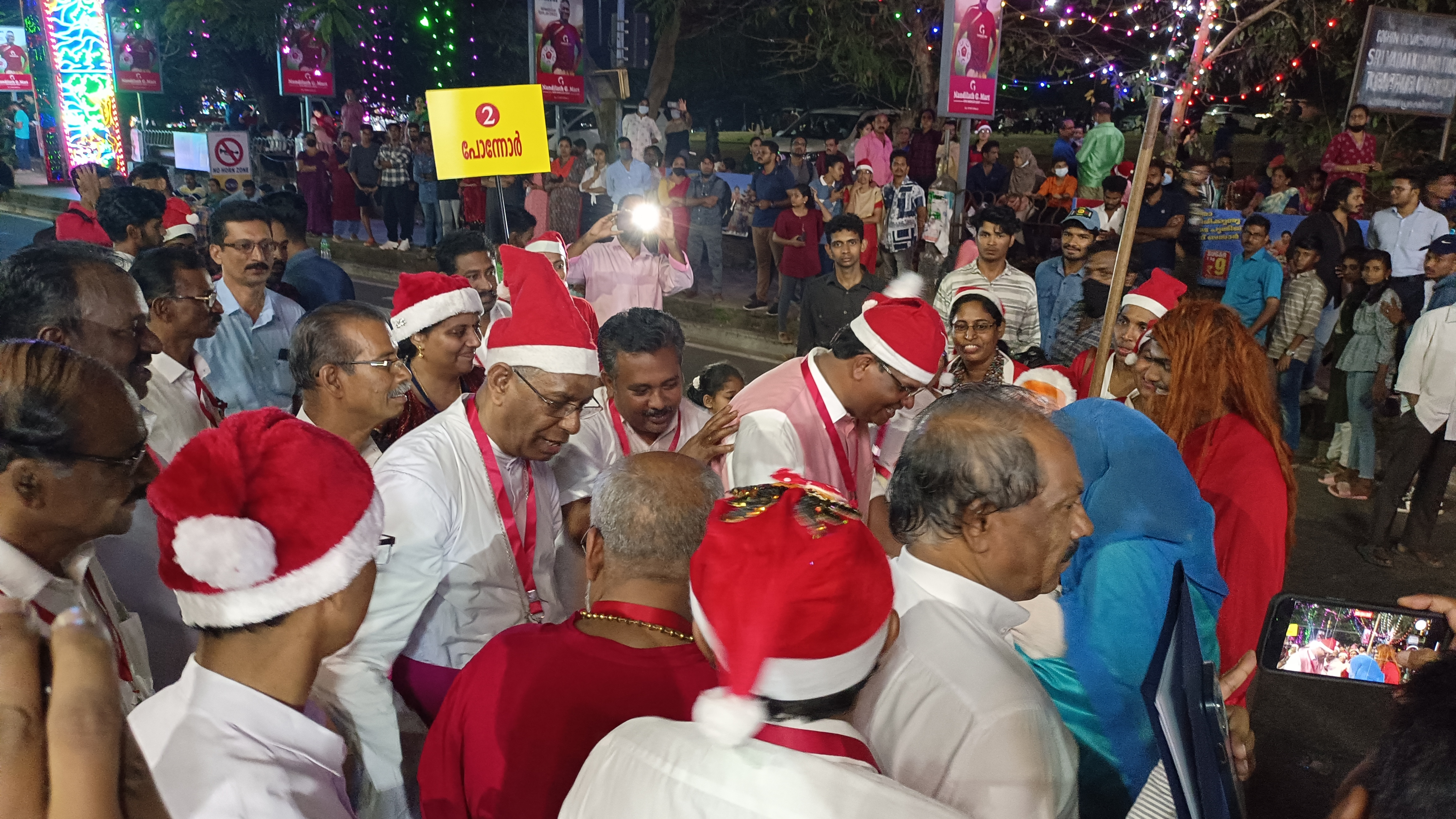
John Barla, Union Minister of India interacting with the Buon Natale participates

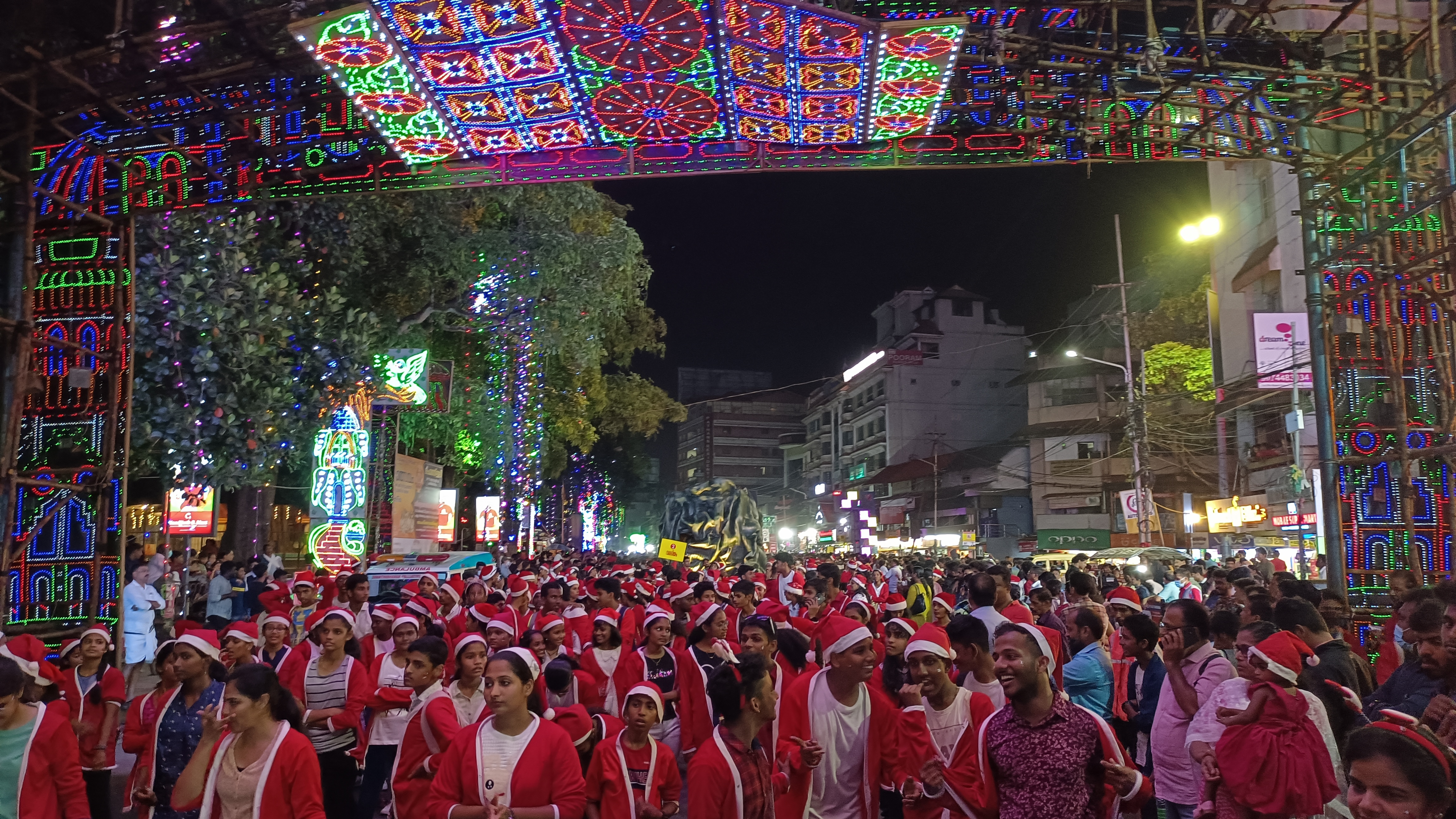
Santa Clause dressed participants

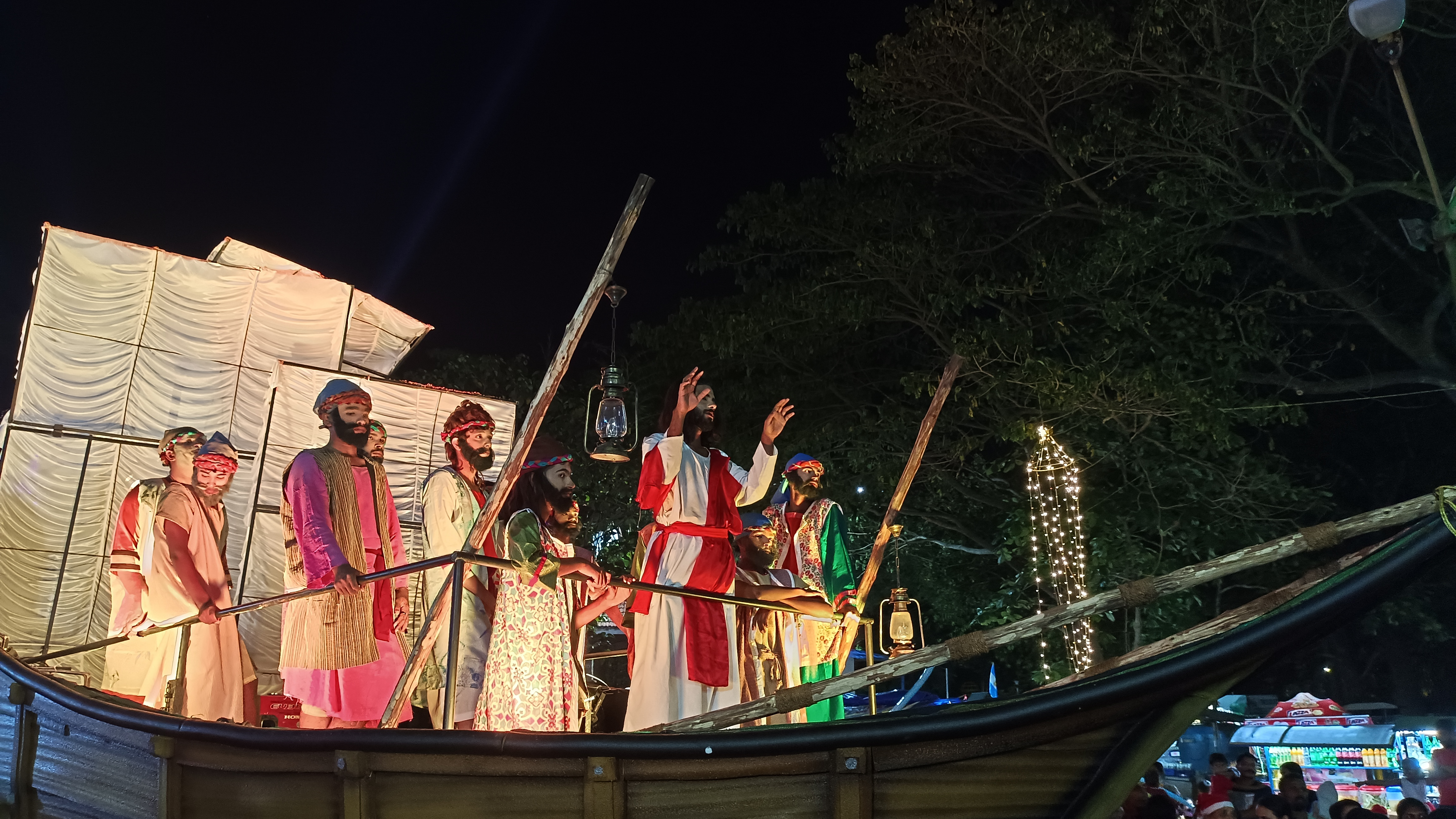
Buon Natale 2022 Plot

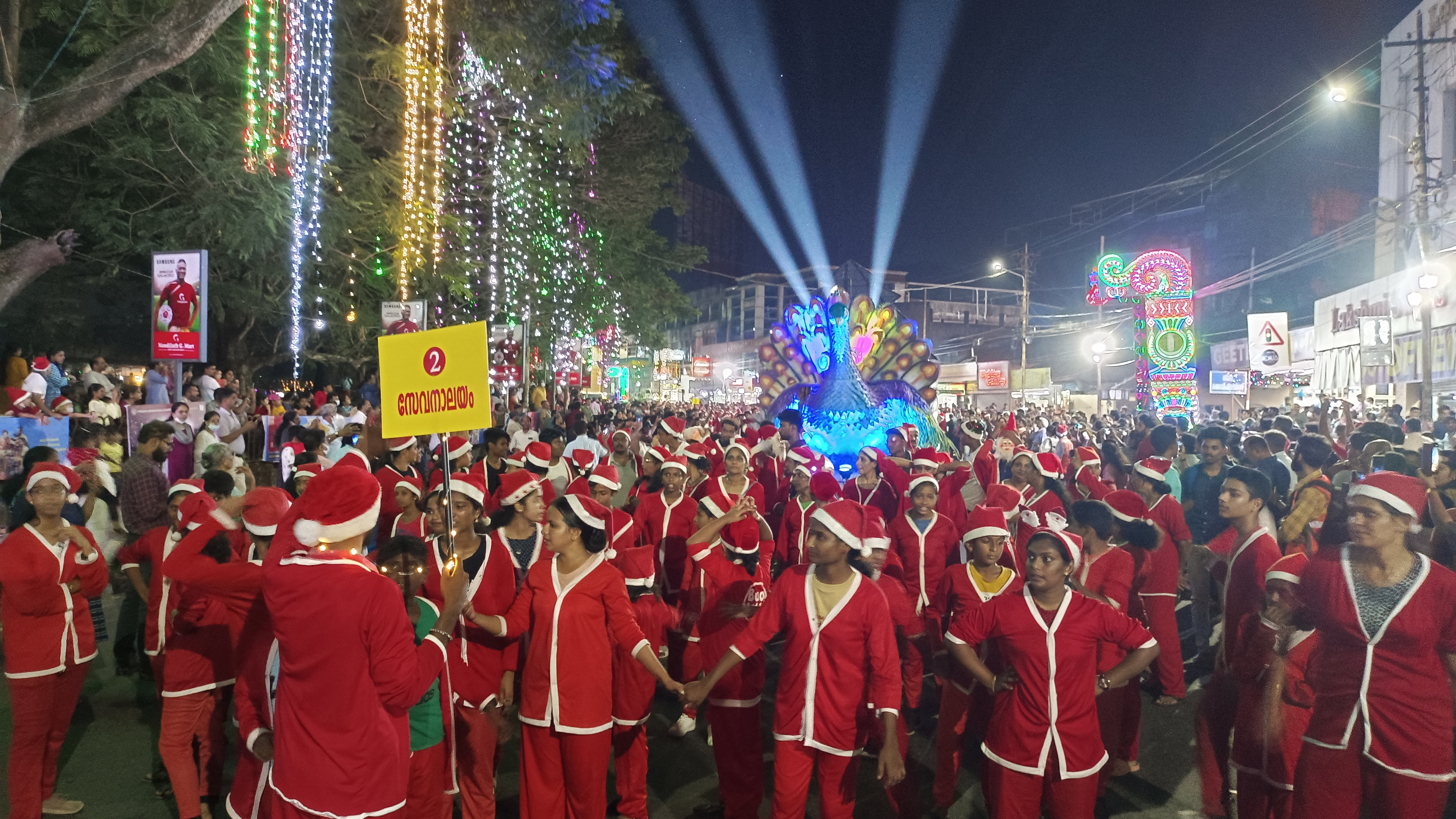
Santa Clause dressed participants

=== 2023 ===
Swaraj Round, a vibrant cultural hub in Thrissur, has been the spirited stage for the festive dances of countless Santa Clauses, providing a lively showcase of Kerala's rich pluralistic cultural heritage. From nursery students to spirited senior citizens, some surpassing the age of 80, and women, all donned the iconic attire of Christmas Papas, joyously dancing to the tunes of special Buon Natale songs. Archbishop Mar Andrews Thazhath, mayor M K Varghese, MP T N Prathapan, and MLAs P Balachandran and Saneesh Kumar Joseph, district collector Krishna Teja were among those who participated in the opening session.

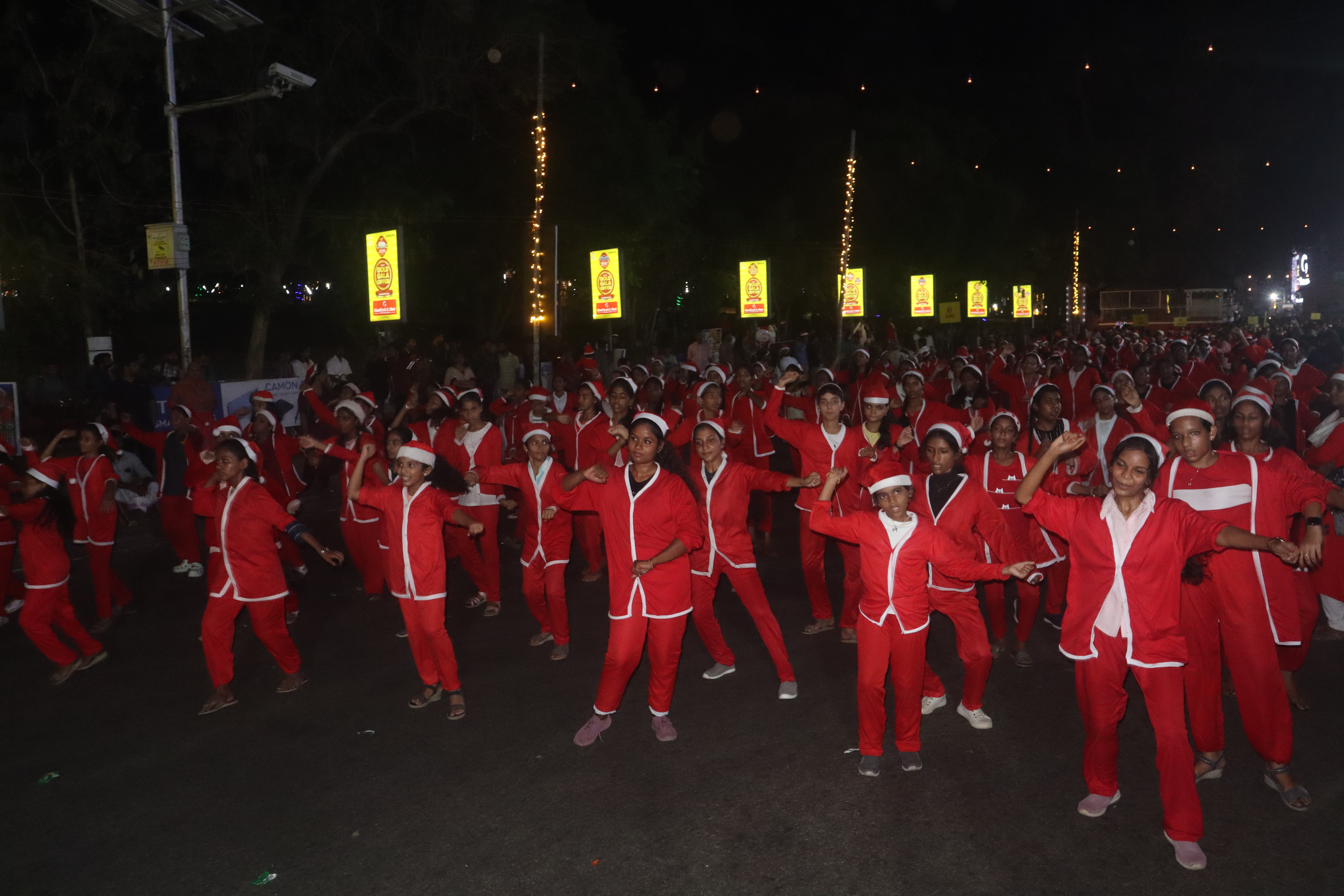
Buon Natale 2023 participants dancing to the tunes of Buon Natale songs

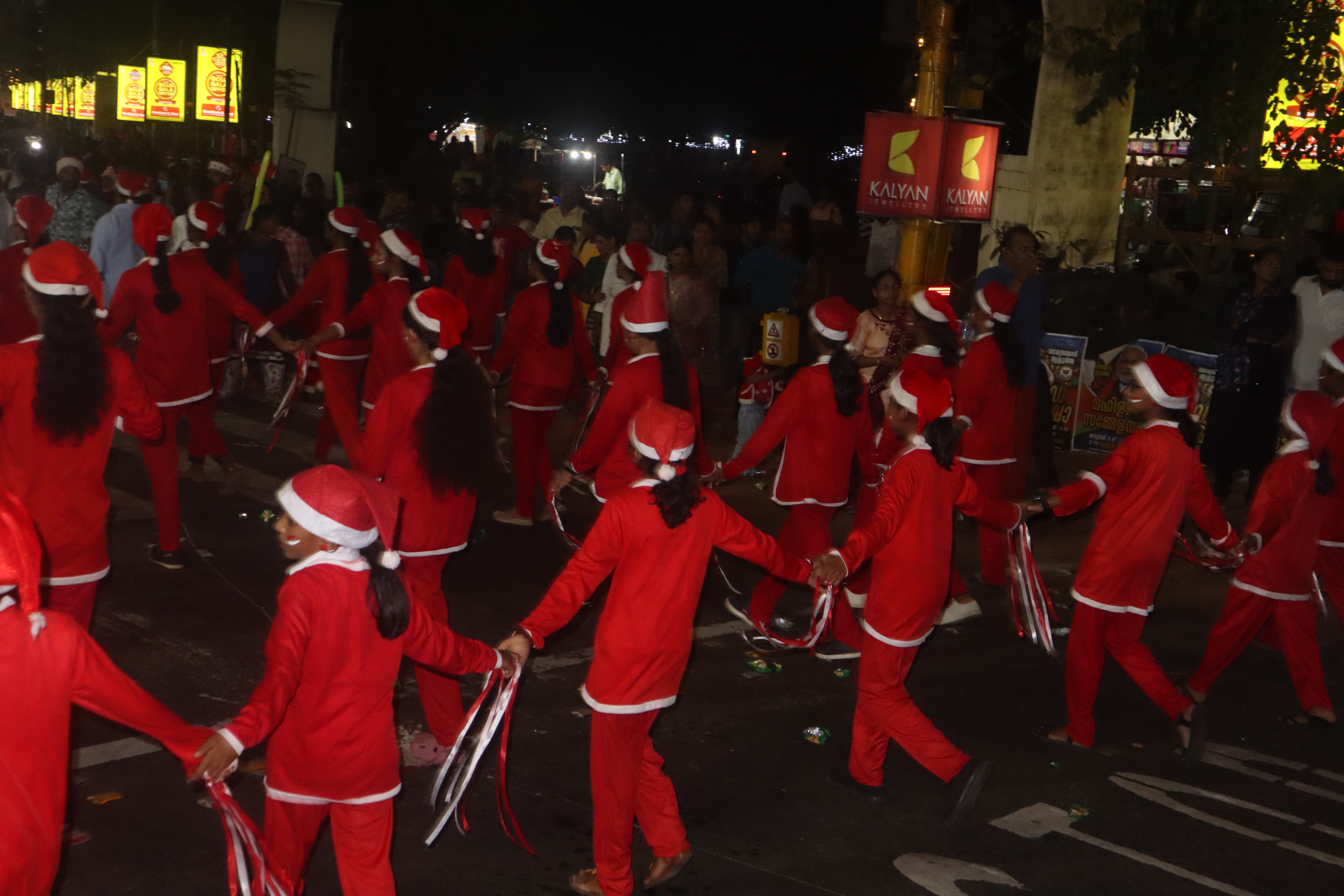
Buon Natale 2023 participants dancing

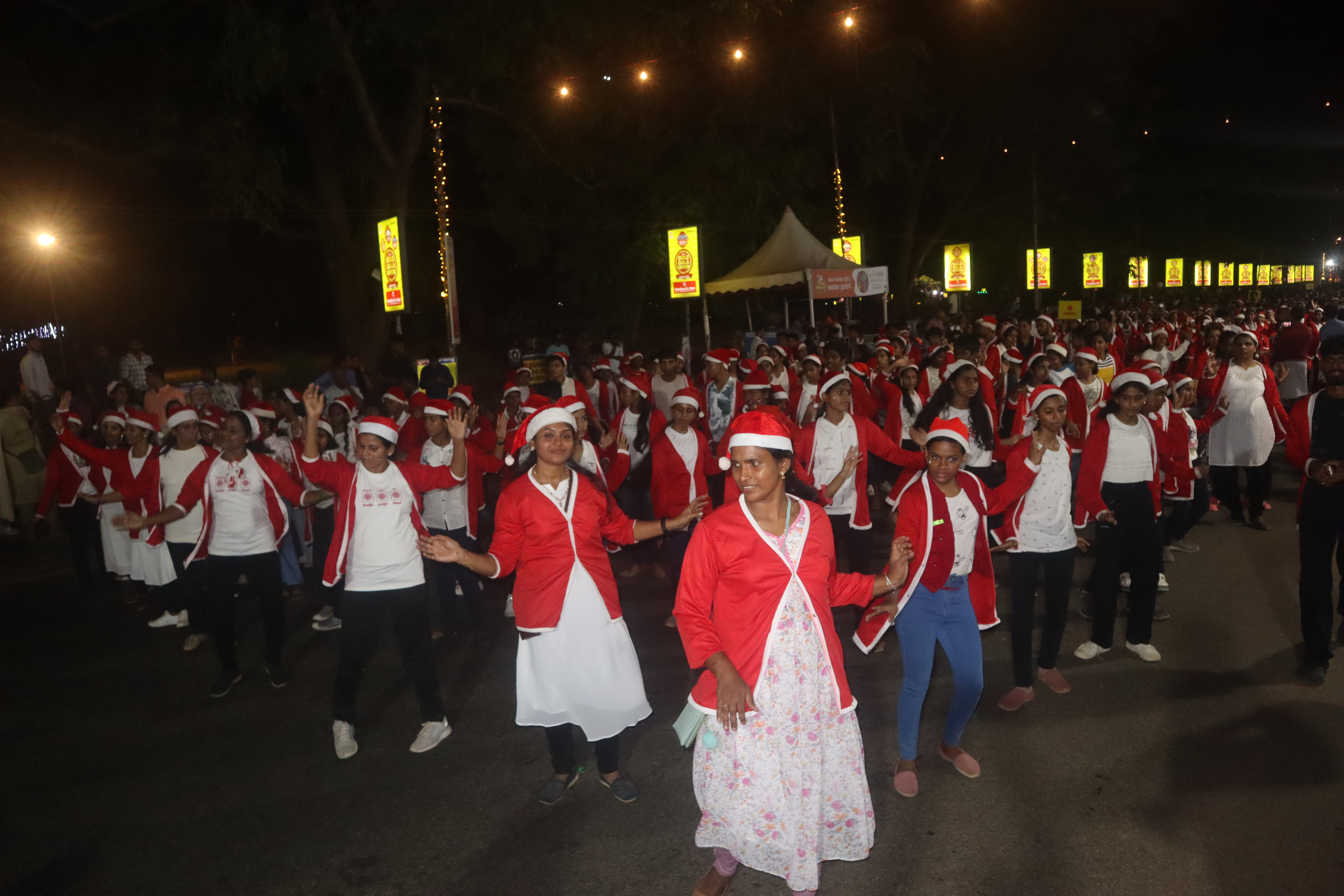
Buon Natale 2023 participants dancing to the tunes of Buon Natale songs

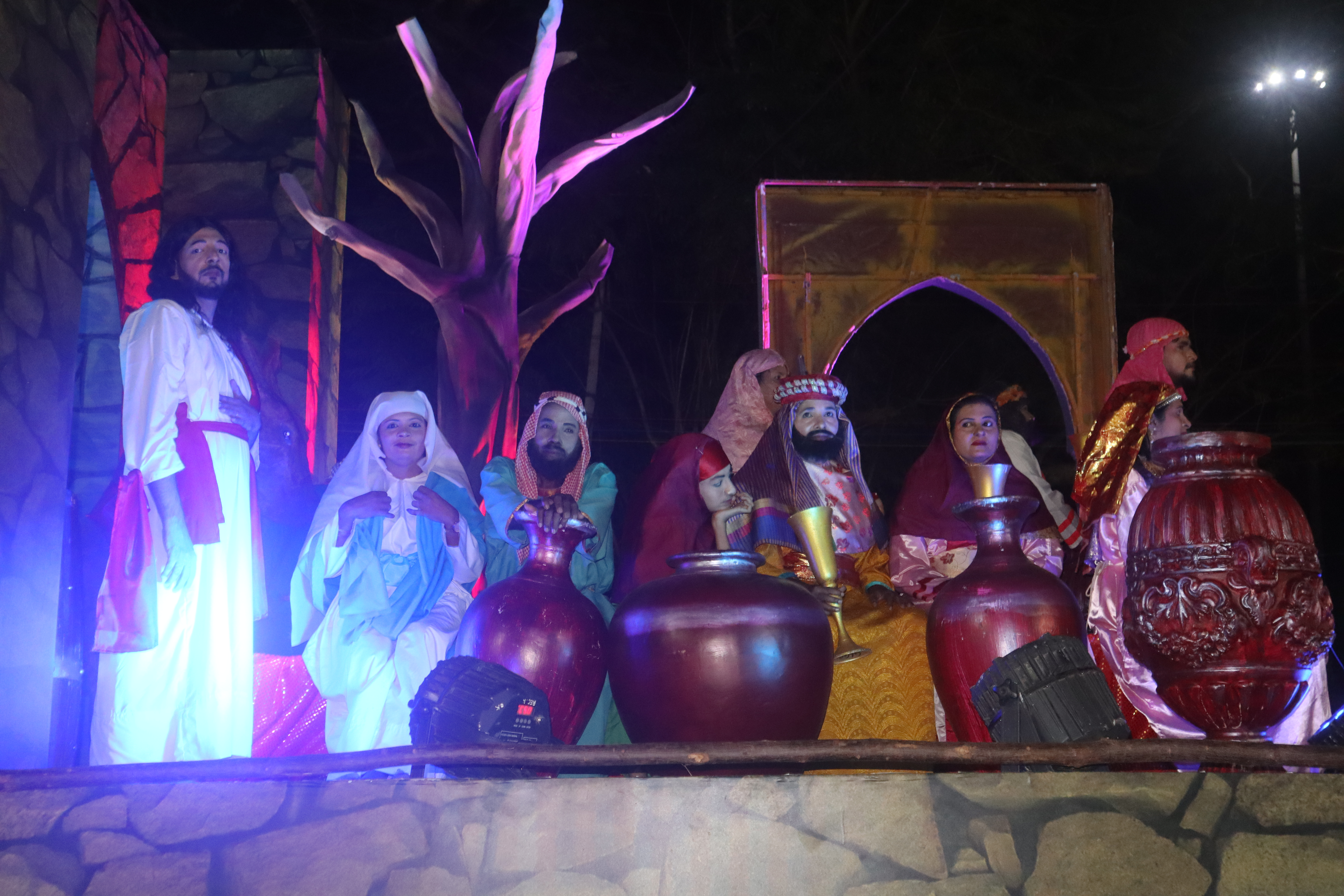
Buon Natale 2023 Plot

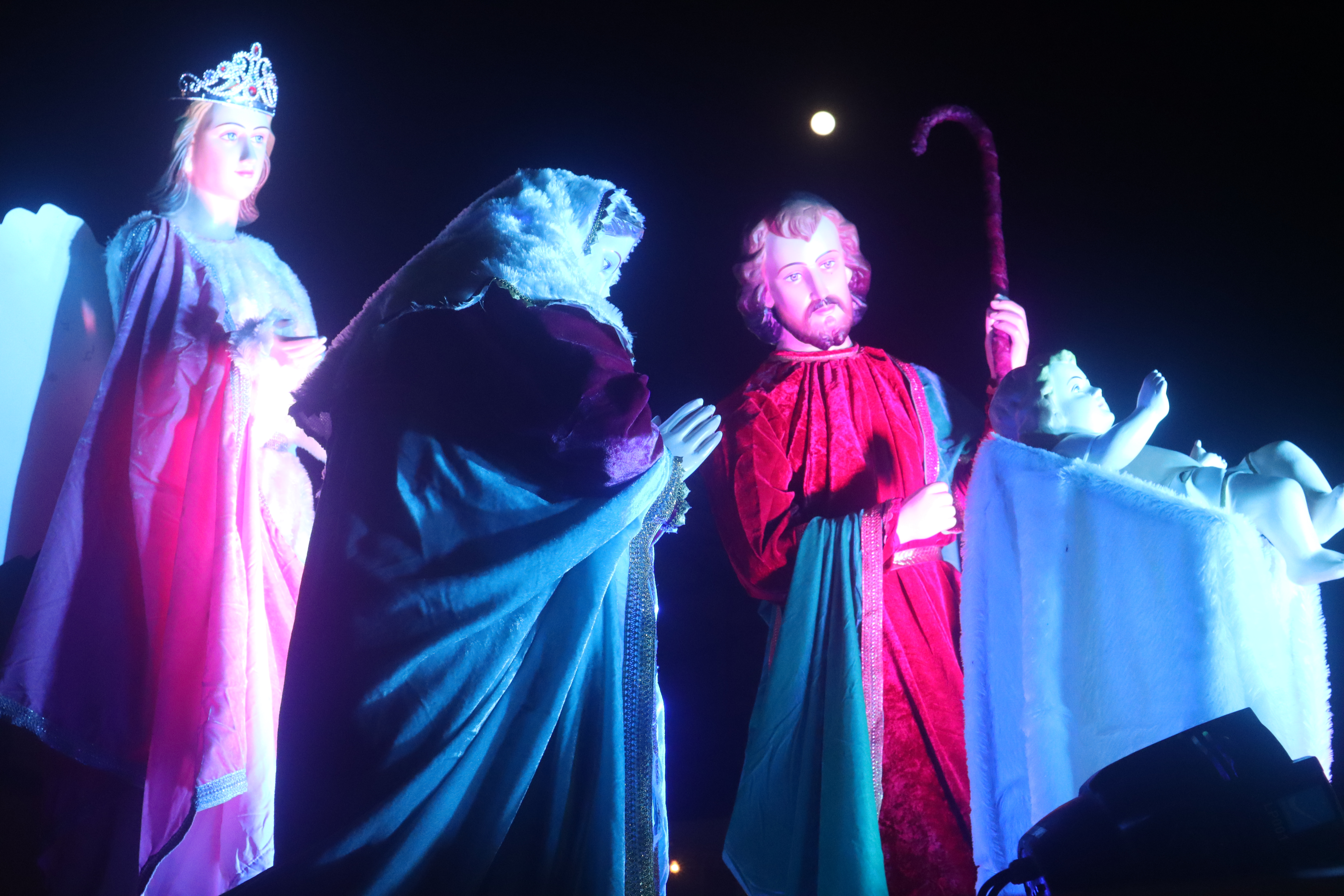
Buon Natale 2023 Plot

=== 2024 ===
In 2024 more than 15,000 people participated the Buon Natale Christmas procession. The event was inaugurated by Thrissur Archbishop Mar Andrews Thazhath, along with Ministers K. Rajan and R. Bindu, P. Balachandran, Thrissur Mayor M.K. Varghese, and other socio-political and religious leaders. Over 110 parishes under the Thrissur Archdiocese participated. The event featured a grand procession, attracting thousands and highlighting Thrissur’s cultural and religious harmony during Christmas.

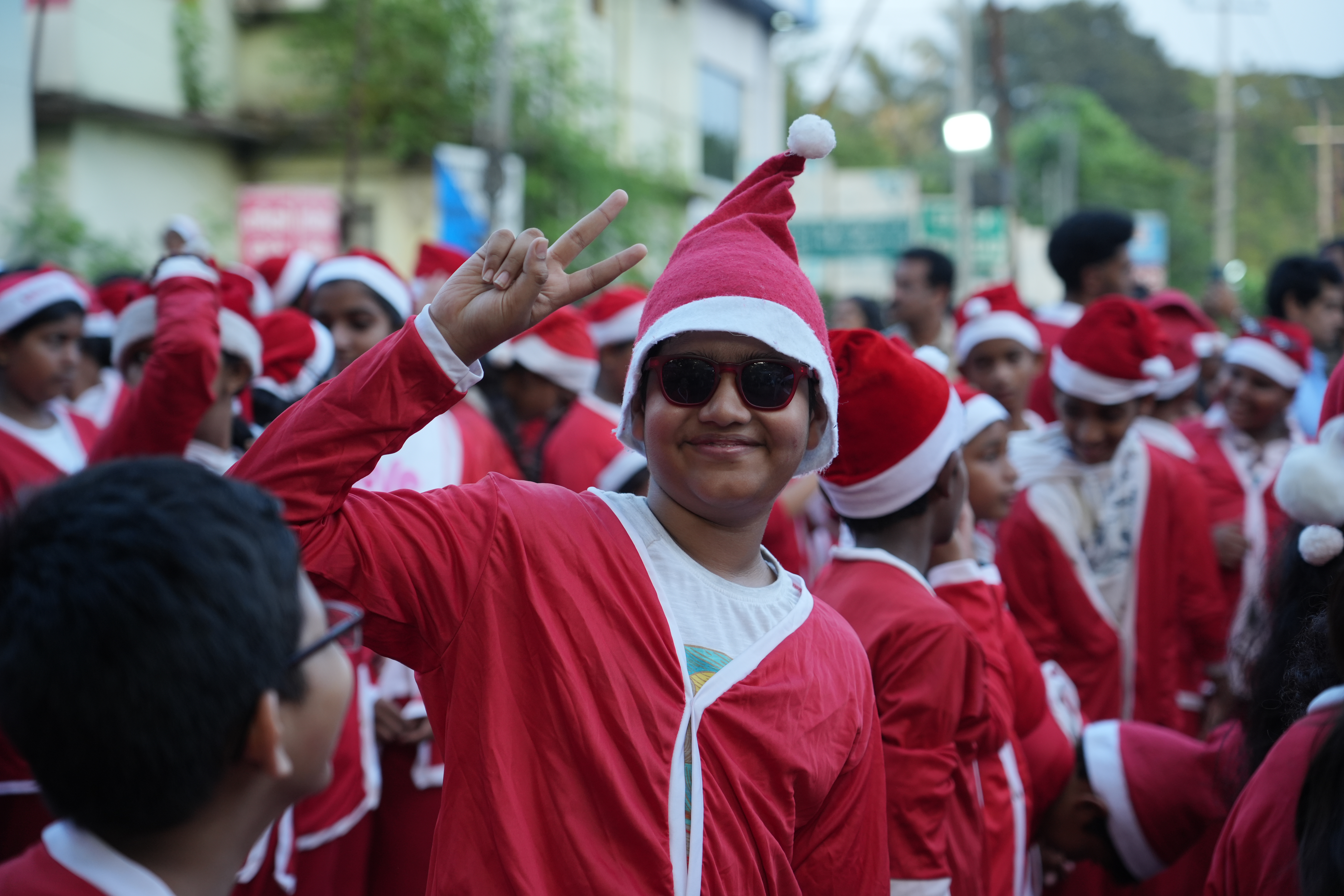
Buon Natale 2024 participants

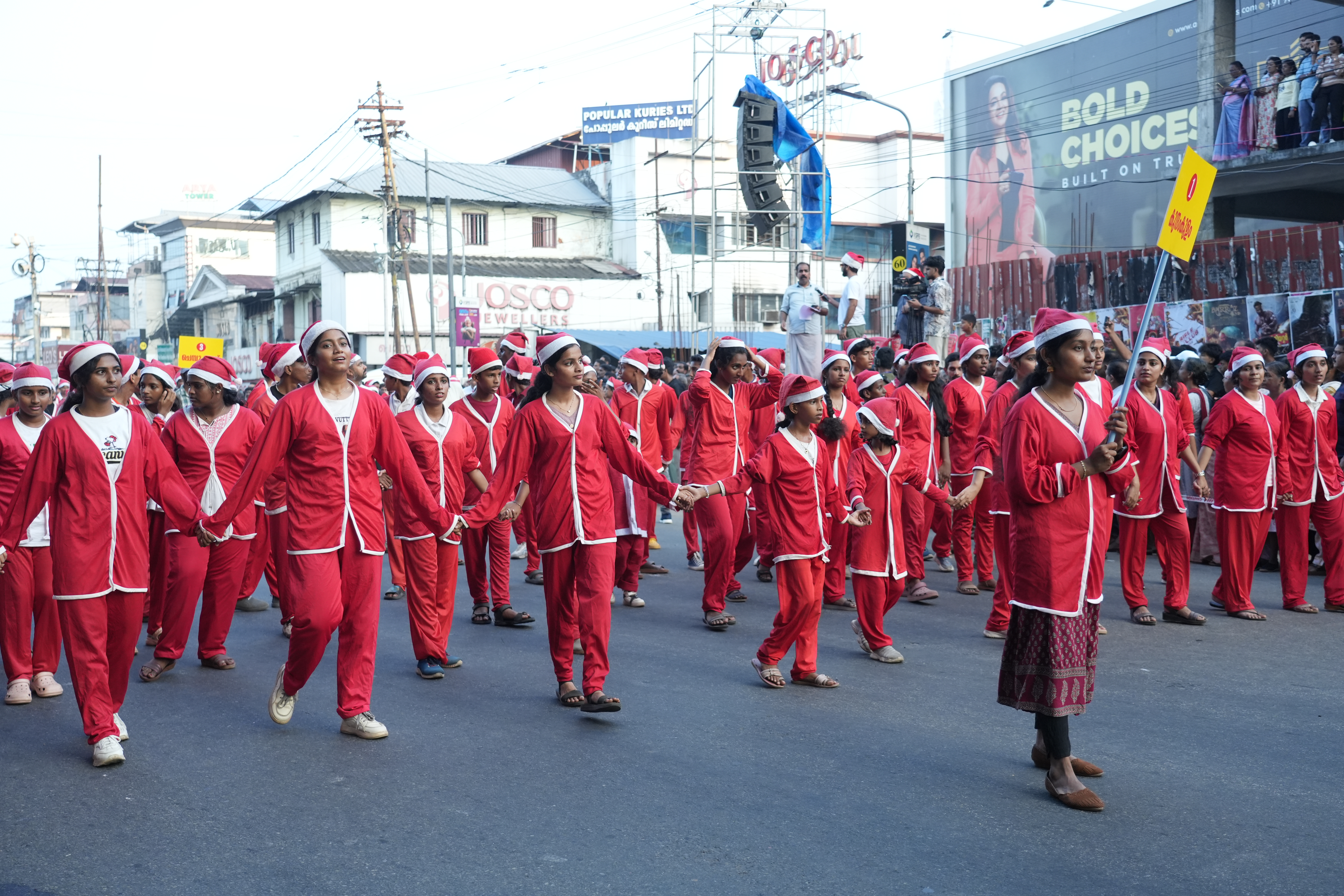
Buon Natale 2024 participants dancing

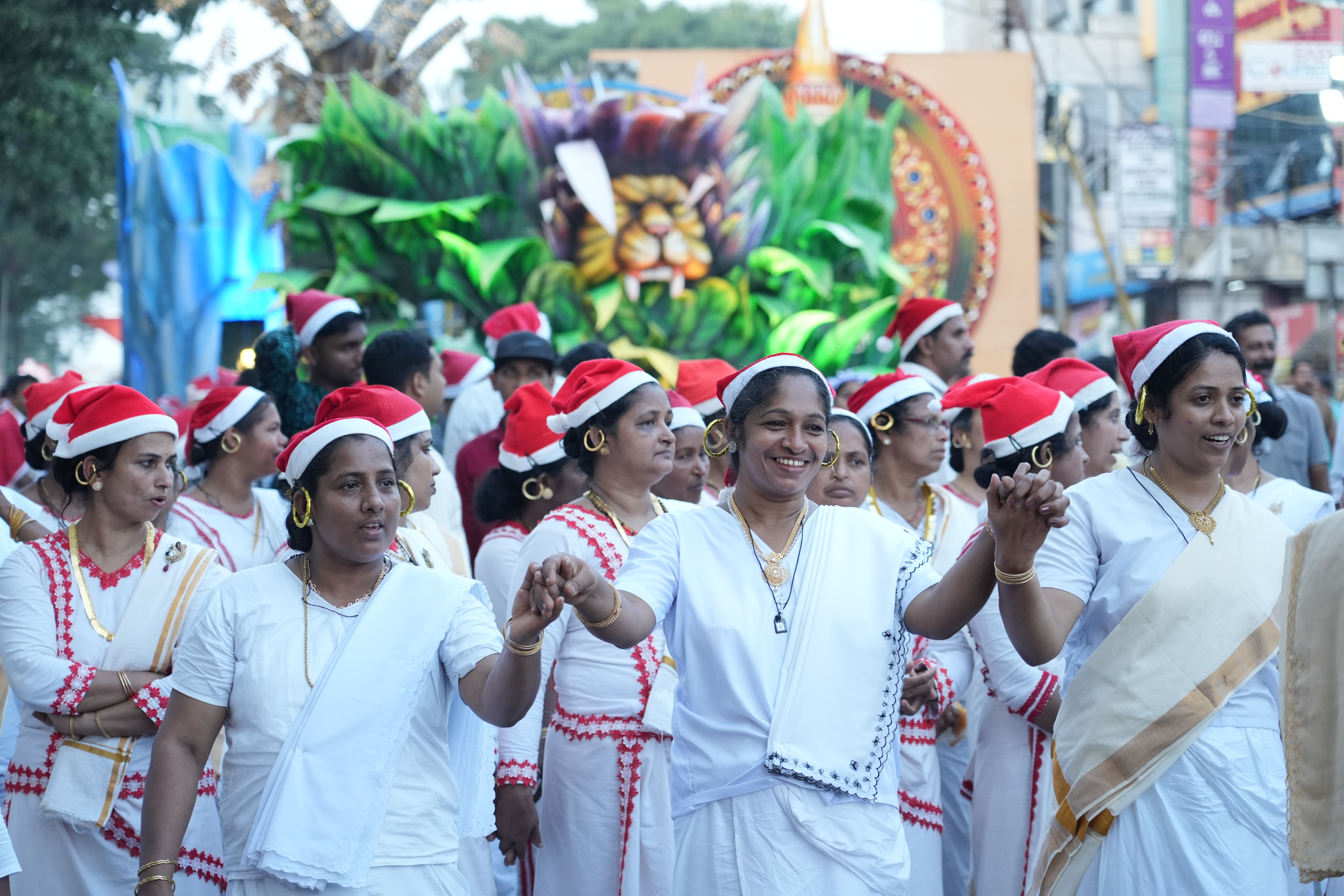
Buon Natale 2024 participants dancing

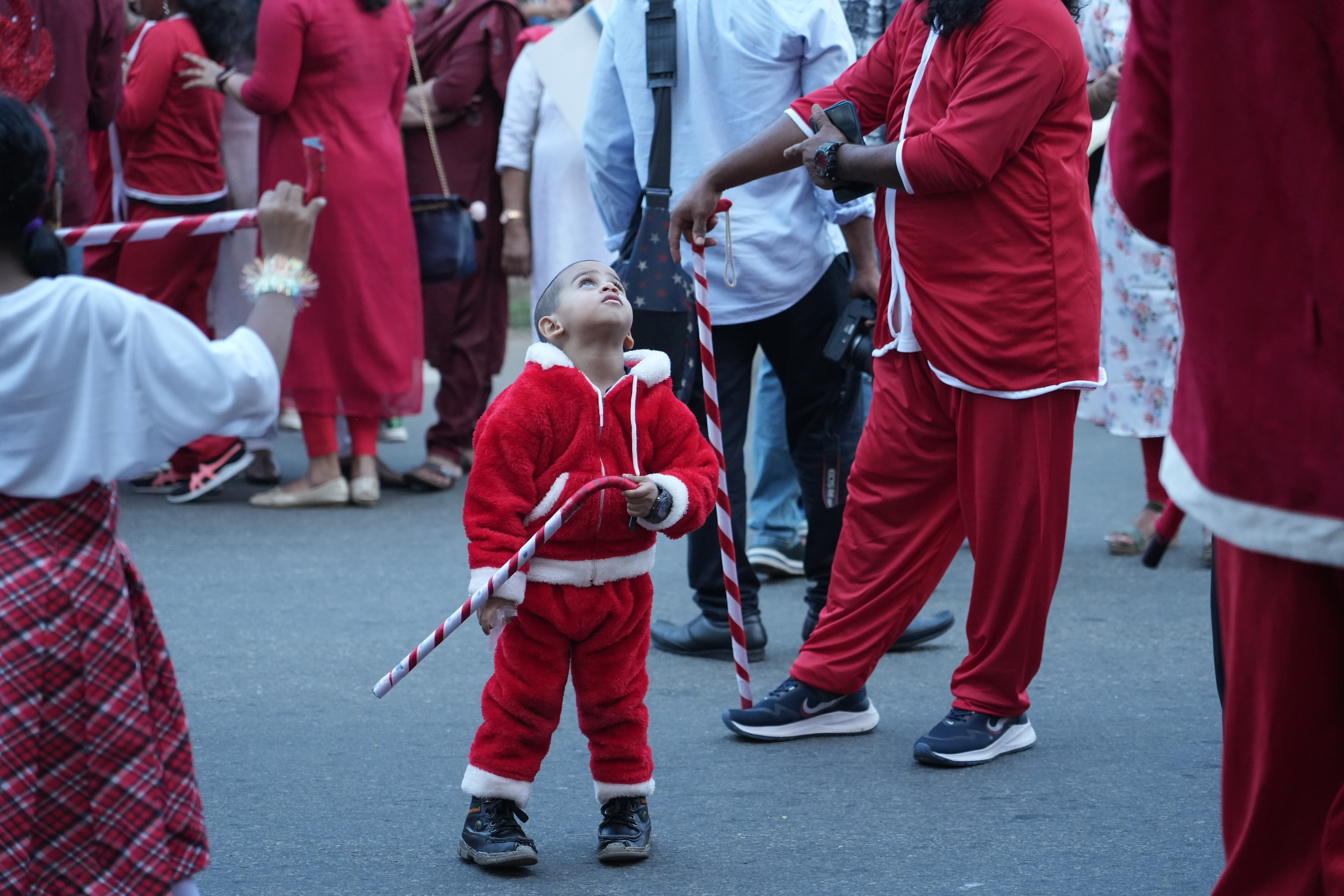
Buon Natale 2024 participants

=== 2025 ===
In this year more than 15,000 participants dressed as Santa Claus marched through the streets, transforming Thrissur into a vibrant display of red and white. The procession was inaugurated by Union Minister for Culture & Tourism, Gajendra Singh Shekhawat. This year’s edition featured a theme song by music director Jerry Amaldev, along with synchronised flash mobs, tableaux, and innovative elements such as skating Santas, a robot Santa, and a drone Santa. AI-supported moving floats created by students and teachers of Jyothi Engineering College added a futuristic dimension to the celebrations. Charity initiatives linked to the event, along with participation from religious leaders, ministers, and civic representatives, underscored Buon Natale’s emphasis on social responsibility, communal harmony, and shared celebration.

== Procession ==
The procession starts from St Thomas College in Thrissur, encircles Swaraj Round and ends at Saktan Thampuran Ground. Members from different churches under the Thrissur Archdiocese participates in the procession.
