= Journal of Electrocardiology =

- Discipline: Cardiology
- Language: English
- Edited by: Galen S. Wagner

Publication details
- History: 1968-present
- Publisher: Churchill Livingstone
- Frequency: Bimonthly
- Impact factor: 1.438 (2020)

Standard abbreviations
- ISO 4: J. Electrocardiol.

Indexing
- CODEN: JECAB4
- ISSN: 0022-0736 (print); 1532-8430 (web)
- LCCN: 75003900
- OCLC no.: 01754562

Links
- Journal homepage; Online access; Online archive

The Journal of Electrocardiology is a peer-reviewed medical journal covering electrocardiography, vectorcardiography, cardiac arrhythmias, membrane action potential, cardiac pacing, monitoring defibrillation, instrumentation, drug effects, and computer applications. It is the official journal of the International Society for Computerized Electrocardiology and the International Society of Electrocardiology.

== Abstracting and indexing ==
The journal is abstracted and indexed in:

- Current Contents/Clinical Medicine
- EMBASE
- Index Medicus/MEDLINE/PubMed
- Science Citation Index
- Scopus

According to the Journal Citation Reports, the journal has a 2013 impact factor of 1.363.
