= Jindřich Marco =

Czechoslovak photographer (1921–2000)

Jindřich Marco (10 May 1921 – 20 December 2000) was a Czech photographer and numismatist. As a photographer, he is best known for documenting the state of several central European cities shortly after the Second World War, the hardships of their inhabitants, and the beginnings of reconstruction.

Following a show trial and seven years' forced labour in uranium mines, Marco turned to safer subject-matter, particularly items in museum collections, eventually writing numismatic books himself. He also created a major series of portraits of Czechoslovak artists, musicians and writers. He briefly returned to photojournalism by documenting the Warsaw Pact invasion of Czechoslovakia.

== Youth and wartime ==
Marco was born Jindřich Fritsche on 10 May 1921 in Prague, to Albert Fritsche, a bank clerk, and his wife Marie, née Spitzová. For his surname, he preferred "Marco", which he used consistently for his photography, and officially adopted in 1950.

Marco received his first camera in 1931. While still at Masaryk grammar school in Křemencova ulice, Prague, he managed to use his Kodak Retina to photograph teachers at unflattering moments (for example, while wiping their noses), and had these published in the magazine Ahoj. Tutoring other boys allowed him to save up for and buy a Rolleiflex camera.

He graduated from the grammar school in 1940, and had intended to study literature at Charles University, a plan made impossible when the Nazi occupation closed all Czech-language institutions of higher education. He entered a business school, and in Autumn 1941 started work as a technical clerk at the Poldi Steelworks in Prague. However, the Germans discovered that his mother was Jewish; and in view of the Germans' close watch on steelworks, he had to quit. He found work addressing envelopes for the Rodina printing company, but soon managed to escape such tedium when he got a position as a writer at Jan Mikota's Prague-based news/advertising agency Umění–služba Umělcům. On one occasion he was asked to stand in for Mikota when the latter was suddenly unavailable for an assignment at a film studio – "photographing the night-time filming of ballet scenes for the film Tanečnice (Ballerina, 1943)" – and did so well that thereafter he was employed as film publicity photographer as well as writer. As a photographer, Marco mainly took stills for the magazines Kinorevue (Cinema Review) and Praha v týdnu (The Week in Prague). During this time he also worked on a personal project: photographic documentation of the fabric of Prague, a city that risked Nazi destruction.

As Marco's mother was Jewish, under the "Nuremberg Laws" he too was Jewish, and he was so denounced by an envious colleague. Mikota was forced to dismiss Marco, who turned to freelancing as a photographer for the film industry. On 19 October 1944 he was sent to an internment camp at Klein Stein, Silesia (now Kamionek, Poland).

== After the war ==
On the approach of the Red Army in January 1945, the Klein Stein internees were let loose. After five days spent crossing territory occupied by both the Red Army and the Wehrmacht, Marco's group of released internees reached Częstochowa (Poland), which was full of refugees, escaped prisoners of war, and other uprooted people. After a lengthy and miserable wait there, they managed, by truck and train and on foot, to arrive at Košice, in eastern Slovakia and the first area of Czechoslovakia to be liberated for the new Czechoslovak government. Later on a day when he had been arrested by a Russian patrol for having no papers (but quickly released), he offered to help the new Czechoslovak News Agency (ČTK), and was immediately given a job. With Erich Einhorn as his assistant, and a borrowed Rolleiflex, Marco was able to find film and developer but no photographic paper; thus his photographs of Edvard Beneš in Košice were copied onto slides and projected.

=== Budapest and Prague ===
In a quest for photographic paper, Marco travelled by truck to Budapest in April 1945. He found the atmosphere very different from that of Košice, with cafés and wine bars doing a brisk trade – although with reminders of death and destruction and foreshadowings of political turmoil and financial collapse. During his visit he made abortive attempts at cinematography and "made the first photographs for his series about post-war Europe, though few from this sojourn are truly superb".

Returning to Košice, Marco learned that the war was over, and endured a gruelling journey to Prague, where he found his parents alive. But learning of hyperinflation in Hungary, he set off for Budapest, where he photographed black markets and other street scenes as well as the destroyed castle. Marco entrusted Zdeněk Hájek, the brother of a friend, with the return to Prague of many rolls of exposed film, but Hájek's train was ambushed by Red Army deserters in search of valuables and alcohol, who threw the film out of the window. Thus little survived; though in some that did, Marco "has applied his sense of dramatic composition and sometimes even absurd juxtaposition of various motifs, which intensify the symbolism of the image of wartime devastation and the return of ordinary life".

Marco returned to Prague in 1945, and the Ministry of Information commissioned him to work for the weekly magazine Svět v obrazech (The world in pictures), newly launched as a kind of successor to Pestrý týden and rather similar to Paris Match, Stern and other heavily illustrated postwar magazines. Marco's photo-essay "Budapešť dnes" (Budapest today) was published in summer 1945.

=== Dresden, Berlin, Budapest ===
Marco travelled to Germany with Jiří Kotalík, a former schoolmate (and later an art historian). Their first destination was Dresden, much of which had just been destroyed by Allied firebombing, and which smelled strongly of the corpses under the rubble. Marco photographed two months before Richard Peter started his own photography of Dresden, some of which in 1949 appeared in a photobook with an unusually large print run, Dresden – eine Kamera klagt an (Note: First edition OCLC 1284293154; 1980 edition OCLC 35596891.) (Dresden: A camera accuses), but:

Whereas Peter employs superb composition and technique to accentuate the seemingly endless burnt-out walls which, particularly in the aerial views, radiate a strangely horrible beauty, Marco was interested mainly in the people of Dresden who inhabited this nightmarish moonscape.

Marco and Kotalík's first stay in Dresden was short. They moved to the eastern part of Berlin, which Marco later described as the anarchy of a desperate population. His photography of people carrying all their belongings or searching through rubble was made more difficult both by a shortage of materials – "He resolved that before pressing the shutter release he would count to ten to be sure that he felt the photo was worth taking" – and by the need to protect himself from onlookers who might be former SS or Gestapo members or otherwise dangerous. Vladimír Birgus writes that Marco "had a feel for eloquent detail and for the juxtaposition of various motifs, [helping] to make many of his photos not only straightforward descriptions of reality but also images with more symbolic hidden meanings"; but "[i]t must be admitted . . . that a number of Marco's photographs repeat the same topic, that countless times they include the dramatic juxtaposition of pedestrians against a background of ruined buildings, which gradually becomes a pictorial cliché."

Marco made a fleeting visit to Prague, developing his negatives and passing them to the staff of Svět v obrazech, and then going to West Berlin, where he took more photographs of life amid devastation. After a short and rather unproductive visit to Yugoslavia (ending with his expulsion), he went to Budapest; among the photographs he took there, those of the large and thriving black market in Teleki Square (with impoverished clowns and performing dogs) are most remarkable:

Some of [these] with bizarre figures in bizarre circumstances are reminiscent of Brueghel's paintings of carnival festivities. . . . In Marco's series from post-war Europe, the photos of black markets hold an important place, and that is particularly true of those from Teleki Square.

For the last quarter of 1945, Marco was again in Berlin, where fashionable life was returning to the Kurfürstendamm, although priced out of reach for virtually everyone other than Allied soldiers. He then returned to Prague to organize his many negatives.

=== Agencies and commercial success ===
While in Prague in Spring of 1946 Marco met an English journalist, Hugh Andrews, who both guided him in the creation of publishable photo-essays and found him work in INP (International News Photos) and, a little later, Black Star. By the end of the year, his photographs had appeared in British, American, French, Hungarian, Swedish and Swiss periodicals; and he was a correspondent for Black Star and thereby possessed a passport and was assured a supply of Kodak film. During the year, Marco and Andrews went to Hungary in order to document the lives of the Slovak minority in the rural area of Mátraszentimre, though not before continuing to photograph Budapest's black markets, now in the throes of hyperinflation.

Aside from Black Star, Marco had contracts with the Pix agency; and received commissions from Life (US), Lilliput and Picture Post (Britain), and Paris Match (France).

=== England and Warsaw ===
Back in Prague, Marco and Andrews started work on their plan to produce picture books similar to those of the "Orbis Terrarum" series of Martin Hürlimann's company Atlantis. Antonín Dědourek agreed to publish them. The first was to be about England, Marco and Andrews' next destination. Marco photographed in London for three weeks, notably a series in the Sunday market of Petticoat Lane, Spitalfields: in Birgus's appraisal, "a superb set of photos full of dynamics and special atmosphere". Marco went on to photograph other areas of England.

[Marco] produced not only a rich panorama of landscape and city images, but combined them with narrative shots of characteristic English behaviour to create an impression of intimate contact with the country and its people.

In March 1947 Marco went to Warsaw to photograph the trials of Nazis for both ČTK and foreign agencies. Warsaw had been damaged more seriously, and its population killed in a greater number, than any city he had previously seen. He photographed the ruins; but any risk that his photographs might romanticize these (as Jan Bułhak had done) is swiftly negated by "the naturalistically depicted filth, mud, and maimed people". He returned to Warsaw in June, taking well-regarded photographs of street musicians and so forth. He also toured the Nordic countries, photographing for periodicals; some of these photographs appeared a decade later in books on Finland and Sweden, but they are unremarkable.

Later in the same year he went to London in order to photograph the wedding of Princess Elizabeth, but arrived too late; he was however able to photograph the second London conference of the Council of Foreign Ministers, as well as "a number of superb street photos . . . the last important contribution to the set about Europe from 1945 to 1947". More specifically, using Leica and Rolleiflex cameras, he had finished the photography for his photobook on England. With 271 plates (and a 52-page introduction by Andrews), Anglie slovem i obrazem was published by Dědourek in 1948 in an edition of 9000.

=== Romantic Prague ===
Also in 1948, Dědourek published Marco's photobook Praha romantická (Romantic Prague). The photographs in this book, as of 2024 not yet published in any quantity elsewhere, (Note: A very few of these photographs appear in Pavel Eisner, Franz Kafka and Prague (New York: Arts, 1950; OCLC 806561), facing pp. 72 and 80. (Photographs elsewhere in this book are by Karel Plicka and Josef Sudek.)) are very unlike the deliberate and oft-published photography of Prague by Karel Plicka: while Plicka's avoid pedestrians, cars, and other ingredients that might date his photographs, Marco's does not do so; Praha romantická "paved the way for later books about Prague by Erich Einhorn, Václav Jírů, and Jiří Všetečka, which celebrate not only the city but also the poetry of its inhabitants' everyday life".

=== Critical appraisal ===
Thus from 1945 to 1947, working in Czechoslovakia, Austria, Germany, Hungary, and Poland (and more particularly in Berlin, Dresden, Warsaw, and Budapest), Marco documented the clean-up of the debris of the war in Europe. Rather than the ruins of cities, he was interested in the fates of ordinary people who were rebuilding houses, schools and factories and returning to normal life. Vladimír Birgus and Jan Mlčoch say of this "large series of photographs" that:

To extraordinary emotional effect, [Marco] captured the strength of people who, after all the horrors, devastation, and impoverishment they had experienced, did not, even amidst the ruins, lose hope in the restoration of a normal order and traditional values.

In his efforts to capture symbols of war barbarism aside from fighting, Marco resembled such photographers as Robert Capa, Margaret Bourke-White, Leonard McCombe, Werner Bischof, and Yevgeny Khaldei.

Marco's depiction of the period immediately following the war "constitutes one of the most important bodies of works of Czech documentary photography"; and in Birgus's opinion the quality of these photographs made them stand up to those by the much more famous Robert Capa when exhibited alongside his in Berlin in 1997.

Souvenir (Warsaw, 1947)

Marco's "best known single work" is a photograph taken in 1947, often titled Souvenir. (Note: Titles include: Warsaw – Street photographer in the Old Town, March 1947 (Bitter years: Europe, 1945–1947 (1995), p. 120); Photographer in the centre of the city, Warsaw, 1947 (The bitter years 1939–47 (1995), p. 38); A souvenir: Warsaw, Poland, 1947 (Aperture, no. 158 (Winter 2000), p. 66).) The reviewer for the Washington Post of the exhibition Foto wrote that it was "[o]ne of the showstoppers", and that:

it shows two soldiers posing for a picture in front of a painted backdrop of a sylvan scene. Beyond them and the incongruous backdrop lies the bombed-out ruin of a large building, now uninhabitable. Part of a series the photographer called "Springtime in Poland", the image is a metaphor of modernity's demise not only as a style but also as an article of faith.

Reviewing the same exhibition, Eve Tushnet wrote that:

the picture's self-consciousness allows it to suggest that photography, despite its illusion of veracity, can be used to lie, and should be regarded as no more transparent and no less suspect than any other medium.

The photograph has been described as a good use of "historical incongruencies"; as a "striking example of an image with multiple and contradictory semantic layers"; and as both linking to the past and suggesting that wartime destruction has rendered a return impossible.

=== Israel and socialist realism ===
In 1948, Marco photographed in the newly established state of Israel, concentrating on the lives of the freshly arrived settlers but also photographing the Israeli military at work in the Arab–Israeli War. Birgus describes his photography there as less dramatic than that of the Life photographers John Phillips and Frank Scherschel, and for the most part lacking the artistic flair of Robert Capa's; but at its best in his depictions of mothers with their small children. Much of Marco's work from Israel, Syria and Jordan was lost in an airplane crash; but those that survived were published in the US and elsewhere. Their first appearance in Czechoslovak books came only in 1991, in Israel 48; seven years later they reappeared in Izrael 50, together with Karel Cudlín's recent work.

The Communist takeover of Czechoslovakia of February 1948 meant that Marco could no longer be employed by photo agencies of the other side in the Cold War. He continued to photograph for Svět v obrazech; and from 1949, encouraged by the writer Nina Bonhardová, he also worked for the agency Pragofot. The work was generally dull, in accordance with the requirement for socialist realism.

== Second incarceration and after ==
In 1950 Marco married Milena Tvarůžková. (Note: Neither in his 27-page introduction to the Fototorsk book on Marco nor in that book's two-page chronology does Birgus say anything else about Milena Tvarůžková or anything about subsequent events in this marriage.) Having supplied a foreign press agency with an irreverent photograph of President Klement Gottwald, he was, just a few days later on 14 June, convicted in a show trial for having "aided and abetted defections" and given a ten-year sentence without parole; he was forced to work in the Jáchymov uranium mines. He was released in 1957. He was partly exonerated in 1973, but "was not fully 'rehabilitated' till 1990" (and thus until after the Velvet Revolution).

By 1957 the Czechoslovak state was much more tolerant of subjects and styles than it had been in the early 50s: socialist realism in photography was being supplanted by humanism and Czechoslovak photographers were again pursuing Surrealism, abstraction, nudes, and experimental techniques. But Marco was not obviously involved in any of these trends, instead working for the German-language magazine Im Herzen Europas (In the heart of Europe), and from 1958 to 1963 in the editorial office of the English-language Czechoslovak Life, specializing in nature, cultural events, and portraits of Czech artists. The latter expanded to "a major programmatic study of Czech painters, sculptors, writers and musicians", in which "Marco's keen eye [reveals] the inner personality of the artist and his work". A selection was exhibited in 1966; in 1988, the series was described as "numbering some 15,000 exposures" and still being added to.

Shortly after his release from incarceration, Marco started a series of book publications. For the earliest, with the poet Kamil Bednář and the photographer Miroslav Peterka, Marco contributed photographs to The face of the country: A picture book of Czechoslovakia, published by Artia in 1958. Artia also published editions in several languages of a book by Marco, Jaroslav Šálek and Jiří Mikoláš about zoo animals; and also books about coins, medals and decorations, and African ritual masks that had photography (and sometimes text as well) by Marco, who "gradually [became] a recognized authority on numismatics and graphic art".

In 1962 Marco married Jindřiška Jirásková, a printmaker, who later (as Jindřiška Marcová) did the graphic design for some of Marco's books; the couple had one son in 1967.

Marco also continued with photography that had no commercial application, making "a number of artistically stylized photographs of architecture and absolutely ordinary things, in which he often uses striking crops, contre-jour, silhouettes, and sharp contrasts of black and white"; and "[h]is interest in Surrealism is reflected particularly in the details of photos from cemeteries, which loosely follow on from the works of Jindřich Štyrský, Jaromír Funke, and Vilém Kříž".

Marco's photography of the earliest efforts to recover from the war was first collected in his 1967 photobook Please buy my new song. This has been called "a powerful photographic document"; and, with Zdeněk Tmej's Abeceda duševního prázdna (The alphabet of spiritual emptiness, a document of a forced labour camp in Breslau), said to "undoubtedly constitute the height of Czech documentary photography from the war years and the period immediately following". The work was also exhibited in Fronta Gallery in Prague; it later appeared in Bitter years: Europe, 1945–1947 (1995) and, in the Fototorst series, Jindřich Marco (2014).

In 1968 Marco made a return to photojournalism, photographing the Warsaw Pact invasion of Czechoslovakia; and, under the pseudonym Václav Svoboda, (Note: Svoboda is a very common surname in the Czech Republic. It is also a word meaning "freedom".) managing to have this work published in Vienna, Frankfurt and Zürich in a German-language book, Genosse Aggressor (Comrade aggressor). Birgus commends Marco for his bravery, but rates his photography of the invasion as not reaching that by Hilmar Pabel, Jiří Všetečka, or Bohumil Dobrovolský, let alone that by Josef Koudelka. A Czech-language version, Soudruh agresor, came out under Marco's name in 1990; it was "poorly printed".

Marco died in Prague on 20 December 2000.

== Exhibitions ==
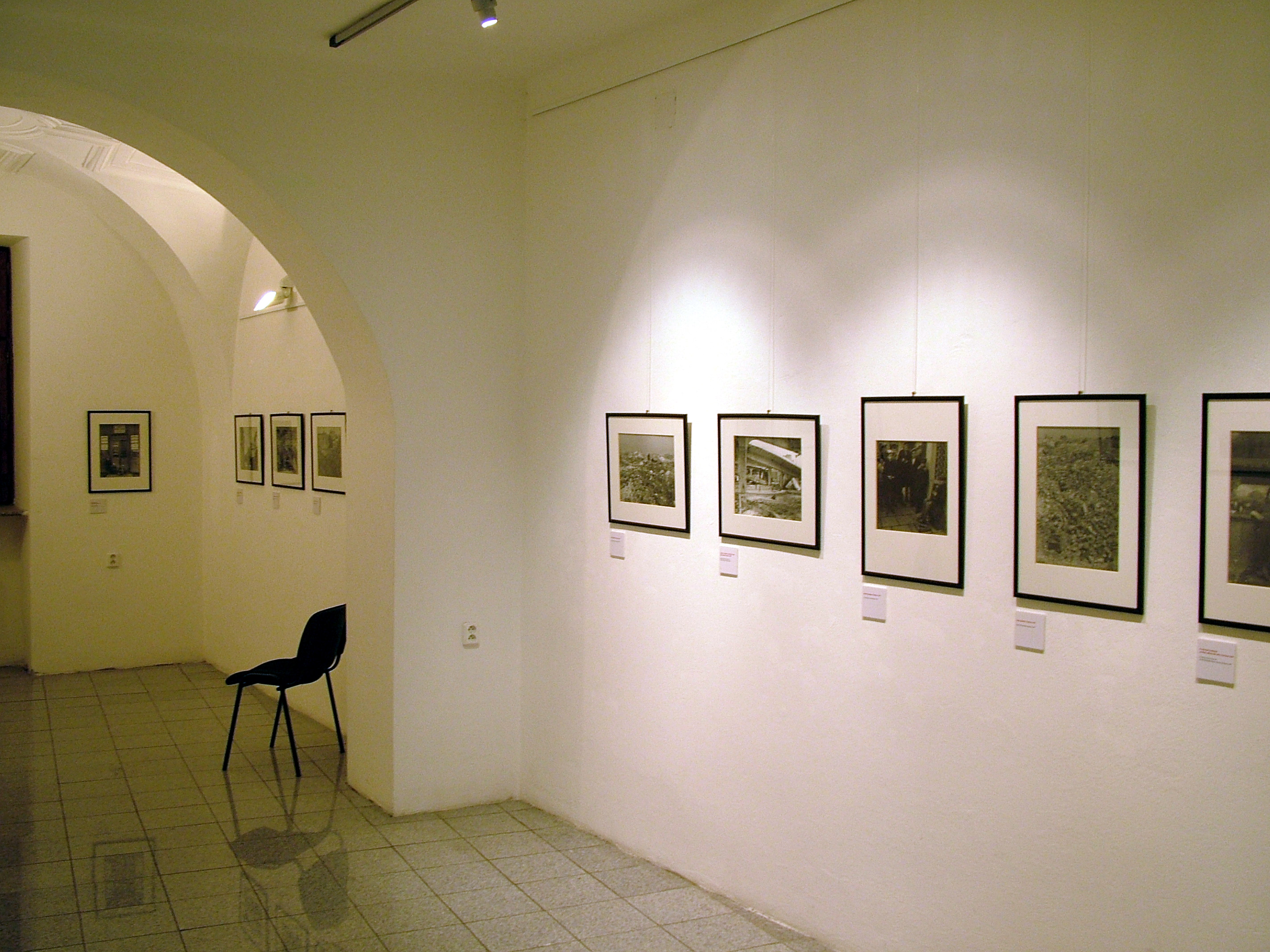
Jindřich Marco's exhibition Photographs from 1945–1948, Month of Photography, Bratislava 2011

Unless specified otherwise, each was a group show.

- Pražští výtvarní umělci ve fotografii (Prague visual artists in photography). Julius Fučík Park, Prague, 1966. Solo.
- Gallery Fronta, Prague. 1967. Solo. Accompanied by a book. (Note: There is some confusion over the title: whether Kus dějin a kus světa (A piece of history, a piece of the world); or Please buy my new song.)
- Evropa 1945–1947. Gallery Fotochema, Prague, 24 April – 12 May 1985. Solo.
- Osobnosti československej spoločensky zaujatej fotografie 1940–1980 (Personalities of Czechoslovak socially concerned photography 1940–1980). Galéria F, Banská Bystrica, December 1986.
- Osobnosti československé sociální dokumentární fotografie 1940–1980 (Personalities of Czechoslovak social documentary photography 1940–1980). Galerie Stará radnice, Brno, 7 April – 14 May 1987.
- Jak rozpoczynal sie pokój (How peace begins). National Museum in Wrocław, 1987. Solo. (Note: Accompanied by a leaflet: OCLC 1281926469.)
- Sto padesát fotografií: Fotografická sbírka Moravské galerie (One hundred and fifty photographs: The photographic collection of the Moravian Gallery). Kabinet užitého umění, Brno, 15 June 1989 – August 1989; Hodonín Gallery of Fine Arts, Hodonín, 15 November – 30 December 1989.
- Co je fotografie / What is photography: 150 let fotografie / 150 years of photography, Praha 1989. Mánes, Prague, 1 August – 30 September 1989.
- Československá fotografie 1945–1989. Valdštejnská jízdárna, Prague, 9 August – 30 September 1989.
- Jindřich Marco: Lost cities. Chicago Public Library Cultural Center, December 1990 – January 1991. Solo.
- Czechoslovak photography from 1915 to the 1960s. Jacques Baruch Gallery, Chicago. July–August 1992. 16 photographers.
- Sztuka czeska i słowacka XX. w. (Czech and Slovak art of the 20th century). National Museum, Wrocław, 1992.
- Hořká léta – Evropa 1945–1947 (Bitter years: Europe, 1945–1947). Pražský dům fotografie (Prague House of Photography), Prague, 27 April – 23 May 1995. Solo. Accompanied by a book.
- Hořká léta 1939–1947 očima českých fotografů = The bitter years 1939–47: Through the eyes of Czech photographers. Prague castle (Nejvyšši purkrabství Pražkého hradu), Prague, 4 May – 18 June 1995; Silesian Museum, Opava, June–August 1995; National Moravian-Silesian Theatre, Ostrava, 6–25 September 1995; Talbot Rice Gallery, Edinburgh, October–November 1995; London; Berlin; Biennale of International Photography, Photographic Centre, Skopelos, 1996. Accompanied by a book.
- Nestoři české fotografie konce 20. století – fotografové a učitelé (Masters of Czech photography of the late 20th century: Photographers and teachers). Galerie výtvarného umění, Benešov, January–February 1997.
- Robert Capa, Jindřich Marco: 1945. Friedrichshain Photo Gallery, Berlin, 1997. With Robert Capa.
- Izrael 50. Galerie Franze Kafky, Prague; Galerie Opera, Ostrava, 3–23 September 1998. With Karel Cudlín. Accompanied by a book.
- Česká fotografie 1939–1958 ze sbírek Moravské galerie v Brně (Czech photography 1939–1958 from the collections of the Moravian Gallery in Brno). Museum of Applied Arts (Brno), 8 October – 15 November 1998.
- My 1948–1989 (Fotografie ze sbírky Moravské galerie v Brně) (Us 1948–1989 (Photos from the collection of the Moravian Gallery in Brno)). Pražák Palace, 24 June – 12 September 1999.
- Znamení doby: Plakát střední a východní Evropy 1945–1995 (Signs of the times: Central and eastern European posters 1945–1995). Pražák Palace, Brno, 17 November 1999 – 30 January 2000.
- Sign of the Times. Manchester Metropolitan University, Manchester, 17 November 1999 – 31 January 2000.
- Společnost před objektivem 1918–1989 (ze sbírky Moravské galerie v Brně) (Society before the lens, 1918–1989 (from the collection of the Moravian Gallery in Brno)). Municipal House, Prague, 10 May – 10 September 2000.
- Fotografie jako umění v Československu 1959–1968 (Photography as art in Czechoslovakia, 1959–1968). Governor's Palace, Brno, 14 June – 30 September 2001.
- Včera byla válka (Yesterday was war). Great Synagogue, Plzeň, 2005. Solo.
- Česká fotografie 20. století = Czech photography of the 20th century. Prague City Gallery
- Foto: Modernity in central Europe, 1918–1945. National Gallery of Art, Washington, 10 June – 3 September 2007; Solomon R. Guggenheim Museum, New York, 12 October 2007 – 13 January 2008; Milwaukee Art Museum, February–May 2008; Scottish National Gallery of Modern Art, Edinburgh, June–August 2008. Work by numerous photographers. Accompanied by a book.
- Magie české fotografie (The magic of Czech photography). Museum in Bruntál, 24 October – 8 December 2008.
- Europeans. Leica Gallery, New York, 2009. With Jindřich Štreit and Vladimír Birgus. Accompanied by a book.
- Tschechische Fotografie des 20. Jahrhunderts (Czech photography of the 20th century). Kunst- und Ausstellungshalle der Bundesrepublik Deutschland, Bonn, 13 March – 26 July 2009.
- Roky ve dnech: České umění 1945–1957 (Years in days: Czech art 1945–1957). Municipal Library of Prague, 28 May – 19 September 2010.
- Fotografie z let 1945–1948 (Photographs 1945–1948). Month of Photography. Central European House of Photography, Bratislava, 2 November – 11 December 2011. Solo.
- V plném spektru. Fotografie 1900–1950 ze sbírky Moravské galerie v Brně (The full spectrum: Photographs 1900–1950 from the collection of the Moravian Gallery in Brno). Pražák Palace, Brno, 4 November 2011 – 5 February 2012.
- Palmy na Vltavě: Primitivismus, mimoevropské kultury a české výtvarné umění 1850–1950 (Palms on the Vltava: Primitivism, non-European cultures and Czech fine Aarts, 1850–1950). Západočeská galerie v Plzni, Plzeň, 30 January – 28 April 2013.
- Photobloc: Central Europe in photobooks. International Cultural Centre, Kraków, 21 November 2019 – 1 March 2020.
- Fotoblok: Střední Evropa ve fotografických knihách (Photobloc: Central Europe in photobooks). Museum of Modern Art (Muzeum moderního umění), Muzeum umění Olomouc (Olomouc), 28 May – 4 October 2020.

== Publications ==
=== Books ===
- Jindřich Marco, photographs; Kamil Bednář, text. Praha romantická (Romantic Prague). Třebechovice pod Orebem: Antonín Dědourek, 1948. OCLC 7468856. In Czech.
- Hugh A. Andrews, text; Jindřich Marco, photographs. Anglie slovem i obrazem (England in words and pictures). Třebechovice pod Orebem: Antonín Dědourek, 1948. With prefaces by Philip Nichols and Jan Masaryk. OCLC 85431027. In Czech.
- Jindřich Marco, Miroslav Peterka, photographs; Kamil Bednář, text. The face of the country: A picture book of Czechoslovakia. Prague: Artia, 1958. OCLC 85322239. With 203 plates.
- Jindřich Marco, Miroslav Peterka, Kamil Bednář, Pavel Eisner. Das Land, dem wir entsprossen. Wanderung durch die Tschechoslowakei (The land we sprang from: Wandering through Czechoslovakia). Prague: Artia, 1958. OCLC 1183796707. In German.
- Jindřich Marco, et al., photographs; (Note: Although the OCLC record does not mention Marco, this book is listed in "Bibliography: Books by Jindřich Marco (selection)".) Oswell Blakeston, text. Finland – Finlande – Finnland. London: Anglo-Italian Publication, [1958]. OCLC 6295268. In English, French, and German.
- Jindřich Marco, et al., photographs; Ian Rodger, text. Sweden – La Suède – Schweden. London: Spring Books, [1959]. OCLC 946502564. In English, French, and German.
- Karel Dittrich, text; Miloš Hrbas, Jindřich Marco, photographs. Antike Münzen aus Olbia und Pantikapäum (Ancient coins from Olbia and Pantikapaion). Prague: Artia, 1959. OCLC 1475637624. In German.
- Karel Dittrich, text; Miloš Hrbas, Jindřich Marco, photographs. Ancient coins from Olbia and Panticapaeum. London: Spring Books, 1961. OCLC 1244223549
- Jindřich Marco; Jaroslav Šálek, photographs; Jiří Mikoláš, text. Zoo in colour. London: Batchworth, 1961. OCLC 155932570.
- Jindřich Marco; Jaroslav Šálek, photographs; Jiří Mikoláš, text. Buntes aus dem Zoo (Colours from the zoo). Prague: Artia, 1961. OCLC 85467748. In German.
- Jindřich Marco, Jaroslav Šálek, photographs; Jiří Mikoláš, text. Bunter Zoo (Colourful zoo). Frankfurt: Römer, 1962. OCLC 1052566128. In German.
- Jindřich Marco; Jaroslav Šálek, photographs; Jiří Mikoláš, Zádor Margit, text. Állatkerti tarkaságok (Zoo motley). Prague: Artia, 1962. OCLC 909786000. In Hungarian.
- Jindřich Marco; Jaroslav Šálek. Zoo i färg (Zoo in colour). Stockholm: Bokkonsum, 1961. OCLC 225833291. In Swedish.
- Jindřich Marco; Jaroslav Šálek. Le Zoo en couleurs (The zoo in colours). Paris: Del Duca, 1969. OCLC 42154660. In French.
- Jindřich Marco, Jaroslav Šálek, photographs; Jiří Mikoláš, text. Zoo a colori (Zoo in colour). Florence: Bemporad Marzocco, 1969. OCLC 42095277. In Italian.
- Erich Herold, text; Jindřich Marco, photographs. (Note: The OCLC record fails to mention Marco, but see the catalogue entry for this book at Arizona State University.) The art of Africa: Tribal masks from the Náprstek Museum, Prague. London: Paul Hamlyn, 1967. OCLC 27298758.
- Erich Herold, text; Jindřich Marco, photographs. Ritualmasken Afrikas: aus den Sammlungen des Náprstek-Museums in Prag (Ritual masks of Africa: From the collections of the Náprstek Museum in Prague). Prague: Artia, 1967. OCLC 2080376. In German.
- Jindřich Marco. Please buy my new song. Prague: Artia, 1967. OCLC 42176027. Photographs taken across Europe, and in Israel, 1945–1948. Captions in English, German, and French. Accompanied by an exhibition. (Note: Jörg Colberg. "Please buy my new song by Jindrich Marco." Youtube, 2011. Colberg introduces and displays Please buy my new song in this nine-minute video.)
- Václav Svoboda (pseudonym of Jindřich Marco), photographs; Hugo Pepper, text. Genosse Aggressor: Prag im August 1968 (Comrade aggressor: Prague in August 1968). Vienna: Europa Verlag, 1968. OCLC 977138192. In German.
- Jindřich Marco, photographs; Georg Wacha, text. Linz. 80 Farbbilder mit Erläuterungen in Deutsch und Englisch (Linz: 80 colour plates with explanations in German and English). Vienna: W. Frick, 1970. OCLC 246258582.
- Jindřich Marco, photographs; Margit Pflagner, text. Burgenland. 80 Farbbilder mit Erläuterungen in Deutsch und Englisch (Burgenland: 80 colour plates with explanations in German and English). Vienna: W. Frick, 1970. With a foreword by Theodor Kery. OCLC 255159626.
- Emanuela Nohejlová-Prátová, text; Jindřich Marco, photographs. (Note: The OCLC record fails to mention Marco, but see the catalogue entry for this book at the Museum of Eastern Bohemia.) Mince a jejich sbírání (Coins and their collection). Opava: Silesian Museum, 1970. OCLC 863437508. In Czech.
- Jindřich Marco. Jak sbírat mince (How to collect coins). Prague: Mladá fronta, 1972. OCLC 16946864. In Czech.
- Jindřich Marco. Münzen sammeln lohnt sich (Coin collecting is worthwhile). Gütersloh: Bertelsmann, 1972. ISBN 9783570041482. In German.
- Jarmila Hásková; Jindřich Marco. Chebské mince z 12. a 13. století (Cheb coins from the 12th and 13th centuries). Cheb: Chebské muzeum, 1972. OCLC 12780770. In Czech.
- Ladislav Stehlík; Jindřich Marco. Jihočeskym krajem (South Bohemia). Prague: Pressfoto, 1972. OCLC 250021547. In Czech, with text in German, English and Russian.
- Václav Měřička; Jindřich Marco. Orden und Ehrenzeichen der österreichisch-ungarischen Monarchie (Orders and decorations of the Austro-Hungarian monarchy). Vienna: Schroll, 1974. ISBN 9783703103568. In German.
- Václav Měřička, text; Jindřich Marco, photographs. (Note: OCLC records fail to mention Marco, but see the catalogue entry for this book at the National Library of Australia.) Book of orders and decorations. London: Paul Hamlyn, [1976]. ISBN 9780600367314.
- Václav Měřička; Jindřich Marco. Faleristik. Ein Buch über Ordenskunde (Phaleristics: A book about chivalric orders). Prague: Artia, 1976. OCLC 251759455. In German.
- Václav Měřička, text; Jindřich Marco, photographs. Das Buch der Orden und Auszeichnungen (The book of orders and decorations). Hanau: Dausien, 1976. ISBN 978-3-7684-1680-1. In German.
- Eva Kolníková, text; Jozef Krátký, Jindřich Marco, photographs. (Note: The OCLC record fails to mention Marco, but see the catalogue entry for this book at Modra city library.) Rímske mince na Slovensku (Roman coins in Slovakia). Dávnoveké umenie Slovenska 10. Bratislava: Tatran, 1980. OCLC 7572149. In Slovak.
- Jindřich Marco. O grafice: kniha pro sběratele a milovníky umění (On graphics: A book for collectors and art lovers). Prague: Mladá fronta, 1981. OCLC 9195502. In Czech.
- Karel Kurz, text; Jindřich Marco, photographs. (Note: The OCLC record for volume 1 fails to mention Marco, but see the catalogue entry for this book at the Museum of Eastern Bohemia.) Úvod do antické numismatiky (Introduction to ancient numismatics). Prague: National Museum; Česká numismatická společnost. In Czech. Volume 1. Řecké mince (Greek coins). 1982. OCLC 440003163. Volume 2. Římské mince (Roman coins). 1995. OCLC 36609398.
- Jindřich Marco. Münzzeichen aus aller Welt (Mint marks of the world). Hanau: Dausien, 1982. Prague: Artia, 1982. OCLC 923239569. Augsburg: Battenberg, 1992. ISBN 3-89441-088-4. Regenstauf: Battenberg, 2012. ISBN 9783866460874. In German.
- Jindřich Marco; Jindřiška Marcová; M. de Goeij. Muntmerken (Mint marks). Amerongen: Gaade, 1982. ISBN 9789060171455. In Dutch.
- Jindřich Marco. Mynttecken från hela världen (Mint marks of the world). Stockholm: Nybloms Forlag, 1983. ISBN 9789185040551. In Swedish.
- Jindřich Marco. Mincovní a mincmistrovské značky na ražbách habsburské monarchie 1519–1918 (Mint and mintmaster marks on the coinage of the Habsburg monarchy 1519–1918). Prague: Česká numismatická společnost, 1983. OCLC 1078759630. In Czech.
- Karel Kurz et al., text; Antonín Bláha, Jindřich Marco, photographs; Jarmila Hásková, editor. (Note: The OCLC record fails to mention Marco, but his name appeared in the descriptions of copies of the book on offer from a number of antiquarian bookshops on 24 December 2024.) Die Geschichte des Geldes auf dem Territorium der Tschechoslowakei (The history of money in the territory of Czechoslovakia). Prague: National Museum, 1983. OCLC 11812103. In German.
- Jindřich Marco. Soudruh agresor (Comrade aggressor). Prague: Mladá fronta, 1990. ISBN 978-80-204-0182-3. In Czech.
- Antonín Benčík, Josef Domaňský, Jiří Hájek, Václav Kural, Vojtěch Mencl, text; Dagmar Hochová, Jindřich Marco, Antonín Nový, photographs. Osm měsíců pražského jara 1968 (Eight months of the Prague Spring 1968). Prague: Práce, 1991. Afterword by Alexander Dubček. ISBN 9788020801265. In Czech.
- Jindřich Marco. Israel 48. Prague: Josef Novotný, 1991. ISBN 978-80-85338-01-0. In Hebrew, English, German, Russian, and Czech.
- Karel Kaplan, text; Jindřich Marco, photographs. Nekrvavá revoluce (Bloodless revolution). Prague: Mladá fronta, 1993. ISBN 978-80-204-0145-8. In Czech.
- Jindřich Marco, photographs; Vladimír Birgus, text. Hořká leta · Evropa 1945–1947 = Bitter years · Europe 1945–1947 = Bittere Jahre · Europa 1945–1947. Orbis, 1995. ISBN 978-80-235-0054-7. In Czech, English, and German. Accompanied by an exhibition.
- Vladimír Birgus, ed. Hořká léta 1939–1947 očima českých fotografů = The bitter years 1939–47: Through the eyes of Czech photographers. Opava: Institute of Creative Photography (Silesian University in Opava), 1995. ISBN 80-85879-19-0. Photographs by Karel Hájek, Tibor Honty, Václav Chochola, Karel Ludwig, Jindřich Marco, Vilém Reichmann, Ladislav Sitenský, Svatopluk Sova, and Zdeněk Tmej. Accompanied by an exhibition.
- Jindřich Marco, introduction. Pozdrav z Prahy = Gruss aus Prag = Greetings from Prague. Prague: Práce, 1995. ISBN 9788020803351. In Czech, German, and English.
- Jindřich Marco; Karel Cudlín. Izrael 50. Prague: Argo, 1998. ISBN 9788072031832. In Czech and English. Accompanied by an exhibition.
- Matthew S. Witkovsky, ed. Foto: Modernity in central Europe, 1918–1945. London: Thames & Hudson, 2007. ISBN 978-0-500-54337-5. Washington, D.C.: National Gallery of Art, 2007. ISBN 9780894683343. Work by numerous photographers; accompanied by an exhibition.
- Europeans: Photographs by Vladimír Birgus, Jindřich Marco, Jindřich Štreit. Prague: Kant, 2009. ISBN 978-80-86970-89-9. In English. Accompanied by an exhibition.
- Jindřich Marco, photographs; Vladimír Birgus, text. Jindřich Marco. Fototorst. Prague: Torst, 2014. ISBN 978-8072154234. In English and Czech. Sixty of the 80 plates are of Marco's early work (1945–1948). (Note: "Jindřich Marco (Fototorst)". Youtube, 2013. A quick (and silent) display of the book, from its publisher.)

=== Other ===
From 1945 to 1950, Marco had about a hundred illustrated essays published in Svět v obrazech (The world in pictures); and from 1958 to 1963 about sixty in Czechoslovak Life.

== Collections ==
- Museum of Decorative Arts (Prague).
- National Gallery Prague.
- Sbírka Svazu českých fotografů v Národním archivu, Prague.
- Museum of Decorative Arts in Prague.
- Moravian Gallery in Brno 86 works.
- Berlinische Galerie, Berlin.
- Deutsches Historisches Museum, Berlin.
- Museums in Nuremberg. (Note: The cited source says "Museen der Stadt Nürnberg, Nürnberg", without specifying any particular museum.)
- Museum Folkwang, Essen.
- National Museum in Wrocław.
- Victoria and Albert Museum (London). Two prints.
- International Center of Photography, New York City.
