= Pestrý týden =

20th-century Czech illustrated magazine

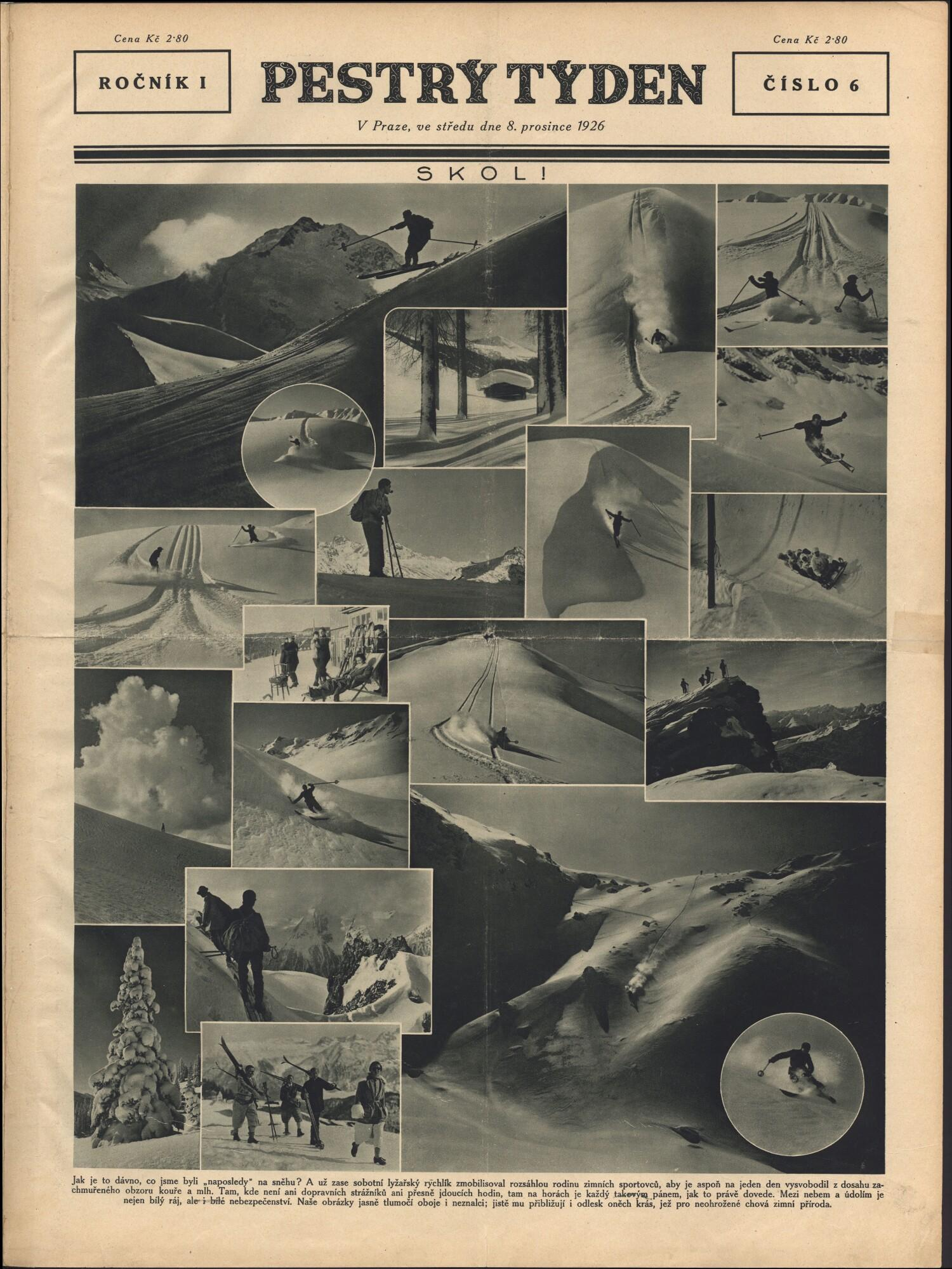
Pestrý týden front page, 8 December 1926

Pestrý týden was a Czech illustrated weekly magazine published from 2 November 1926 to 28 April 1945, during the First and Second Czechoslovak Republics and during the Protectorate of Bohemia and Moravia. It helped establish top photo-reporters of the 1930s, such as Karel Hájek, Václav Jírů and Ladislav Sitenský. Published and printed by Grafické závody ('Graphic Works') by Václav Neubert and Sons, based in Smíchov, Prague it was issued in 963 numbers.

== Establishment ==
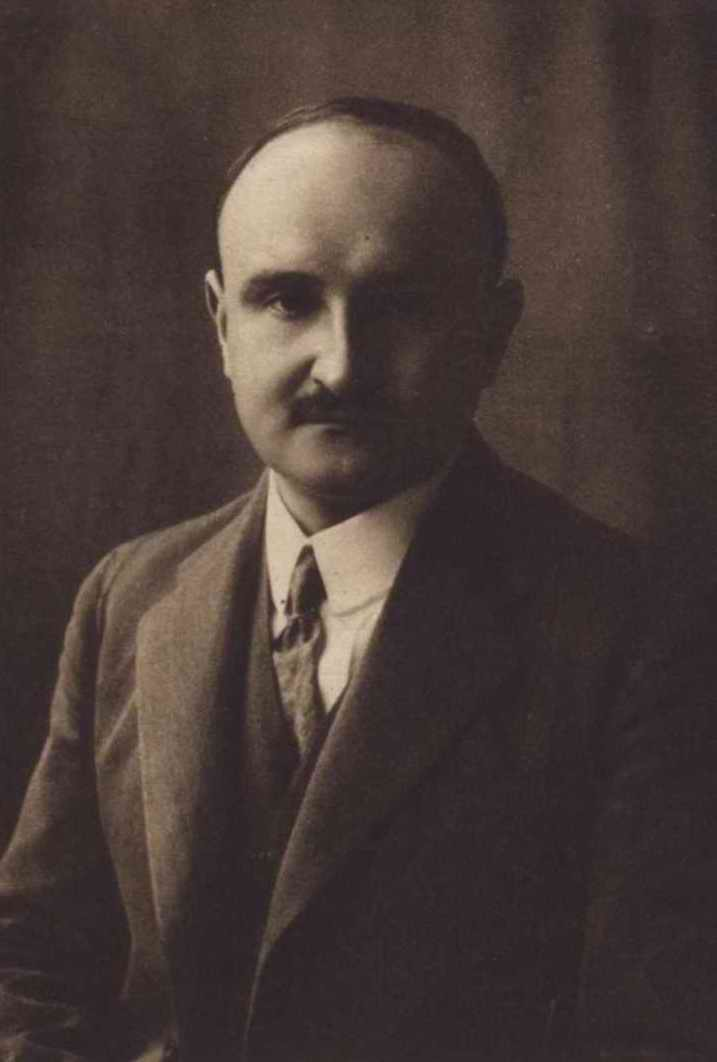
Karel Neubert, son of the publisher Václav Neubert, from Pestrý týden, 12 June 1927

Pestrý týden was founded by Karel Neubert, who managed it until its demise in 1945. In English, the title may be translated as 'Colourful', 'Variegated' or 'Prismatic Week'.

The editorial circle in the first years consisted of: journalist Milena Jesenská, graphic artist Vratislav Hugo Brunner, painter, poet and founding member of Devětsil Adolf Hoffmeister, and publisher Karel Neubert. This group of editors sought to create an intellectual magazine. At the end of the 1920s, this editorial office was replaced by a group around Jaromír Johna, under whom it was transformed from an élite revue into a pictorial family weekly for the middle classes. Thanks to this new focus, the circulation of Pestrý týden increased to hundreds of thousands of copies in a short time and it was able to establish itself against considerable competition from other First Republic periodicals Pražský ilustrovaný zpravodaj, Letem světem, Světozor, Ahoj, Star, Světový zdroj zábavy, Eva, Hvězda československých paní a dívek and List paní a dívek.

== Zenith ==
Pestrý týden's peak years were 1938–1939 during which its "flawless gravure printing, as well as comprehensive articles and columns from home and abroad" made it qualitatively the equal of contemporaneous world weekly picture magazines. During a tense period in Czech history it excelled in printed picture reportage by top Czech photographers to an extent unprecedented in competing papers.

== During the Protectorate ==
From 1940, Pestrý týden was the official organ of Radosti ze života ('Joy of Life'), the sole socio-political movement in the Protectorate, National Partnership. The period marks a gradual decline in quality. Under the Nazi protectorate, the magazine diverged from its news function, with the exception of ideologically distorted news from Germany, and instead covered more general stories. Publisher and editor-in-chief Karel Neubert did his best not to promote Nazi ideology more than he was forced to by the authorities.

== Cessation ==
Pestrý týden ceased publication just before the outbreak of the Prague uprising in 1945. In less than a month, the former editors formed a new news weekly called Svět v obrazech ('The World in Pictures').

== Prominent contributing photographers ==
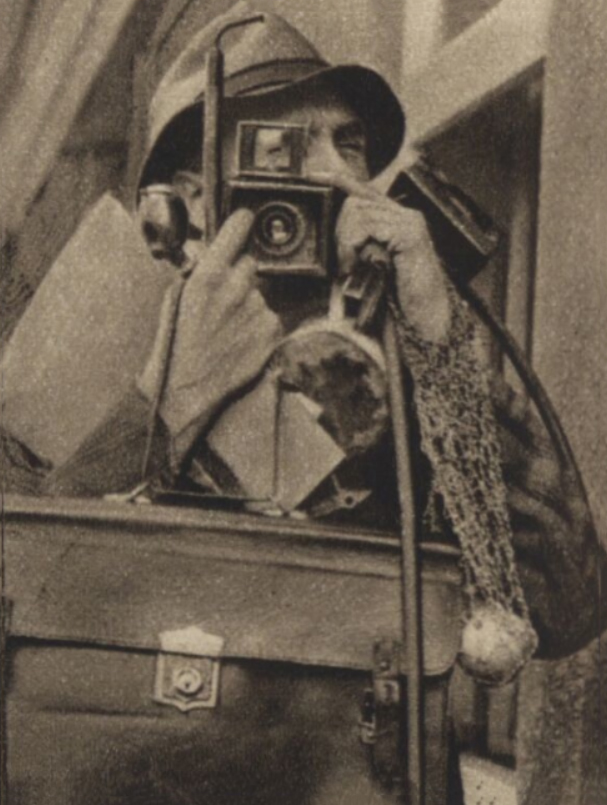
Photographer Přemysl Koblic in 1943 juggling a small-format camera, flash gun, briefcase, folder, pipe and spare bulb

- Pavel Altschul
- Erich Auerbach
- Jaroslav Balzar
- Emil Ladislav Berka
- Karel Capek
- Karel Drbohlav
- František Drtikol
- Josef Ehm
- Jaroslav Fabinger
- Emil Fafek
- Jaromír Funke
- Alexander Hackenschmied
- Karel Hájek
- Miroslav Hák
- Josef Hanka
- Tibor Honty
- Vaclav Chochola
- František Illek
- Jiří Jeníček
- Staša Jílovská
- Václav Jírů
- Přemysl Koblic
- Fred Kramer
- Jan Langhans
- Karel Ludwig
- Jan Lukas
- Jindřich Marco
- Alexandr Paul
- Karel Plicka
- Jan Posselt
- Jaroslav Rössler
- Josef Jindřich Šechtl
- Ladislav Sitenský
- Jan Vaclav Stanek
- Oldrich Straka
- Willi Ströminger
- Josef Sudek
- Bohumil Šťastný
- Zdeněk Tmej
- Jindrich Vanek
- Eugen Wiškovský

== Bibliography ==
- Vilgus, Petr: České ilustrované časopisy mezi roky 1918–1945 na příkladu Pražského ilustrovaného zpravodaje a Pestrého týdne, Praha 2007. available online.
- Vilgus, Petr: Pestrý týden, 2. listopadu 1926 – 28. dubna 1945 : Vznik, existence a zánik nejlepšího ilustrovaného týdeníku první a druhé Československé republiky an období Protektorátu Čechy a Morava, Praha-Opava 2001, ISBN 80-238-7874-3. available online.
