= Migration Period art =

C. 300–900 Germanic and Hiberno-Saxon art

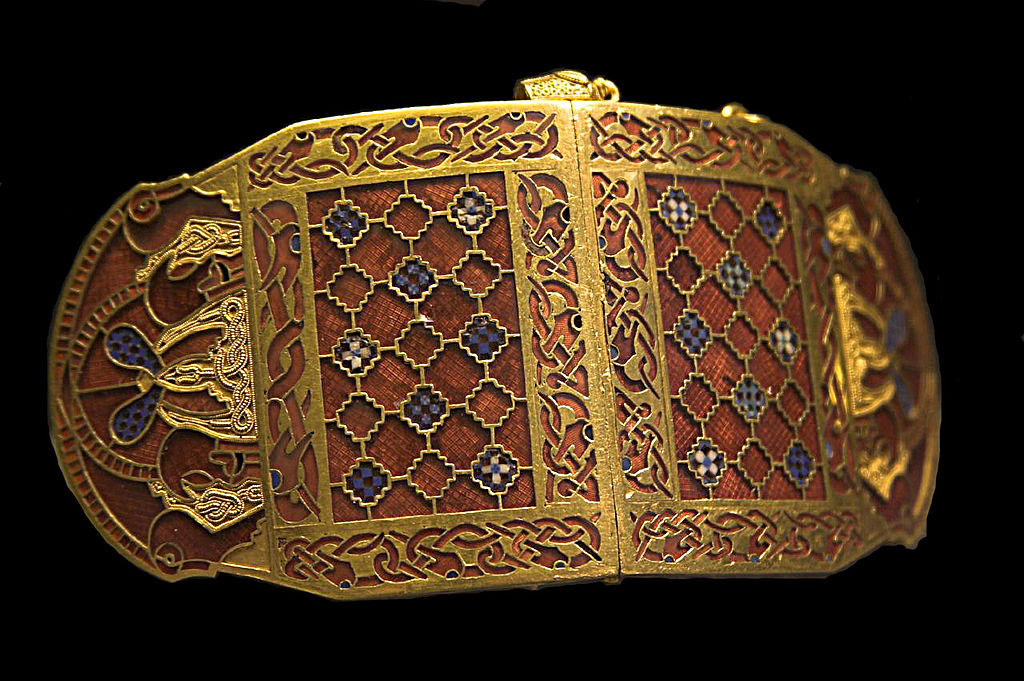
Shoulder-clasps from the 7th century Anglo-Saxon ship burial at Sutton Hoo. Alternate view. British Museum.

Migration Period art denotes the artwork of the Germanic peoples during the Migration period (c. 300 – 800). It includes the Migration art of the Germanic tribes on the continent, as well the start of the Insular art or Hiberno-Saxon art of the Anglo-Saxon and Celtic fusion in Britain and Ireland. It covers many different styles of art including the polychrome style and the animal style. After Christianization, Migration Period art developed into various schools of Early Medieval art in Western Europe which are normally classified by region, such as Anglo-Saxon art and Carolingian art, before the continent-wide styles of Romanesque art and finally Gothic art developed.

== Background ==
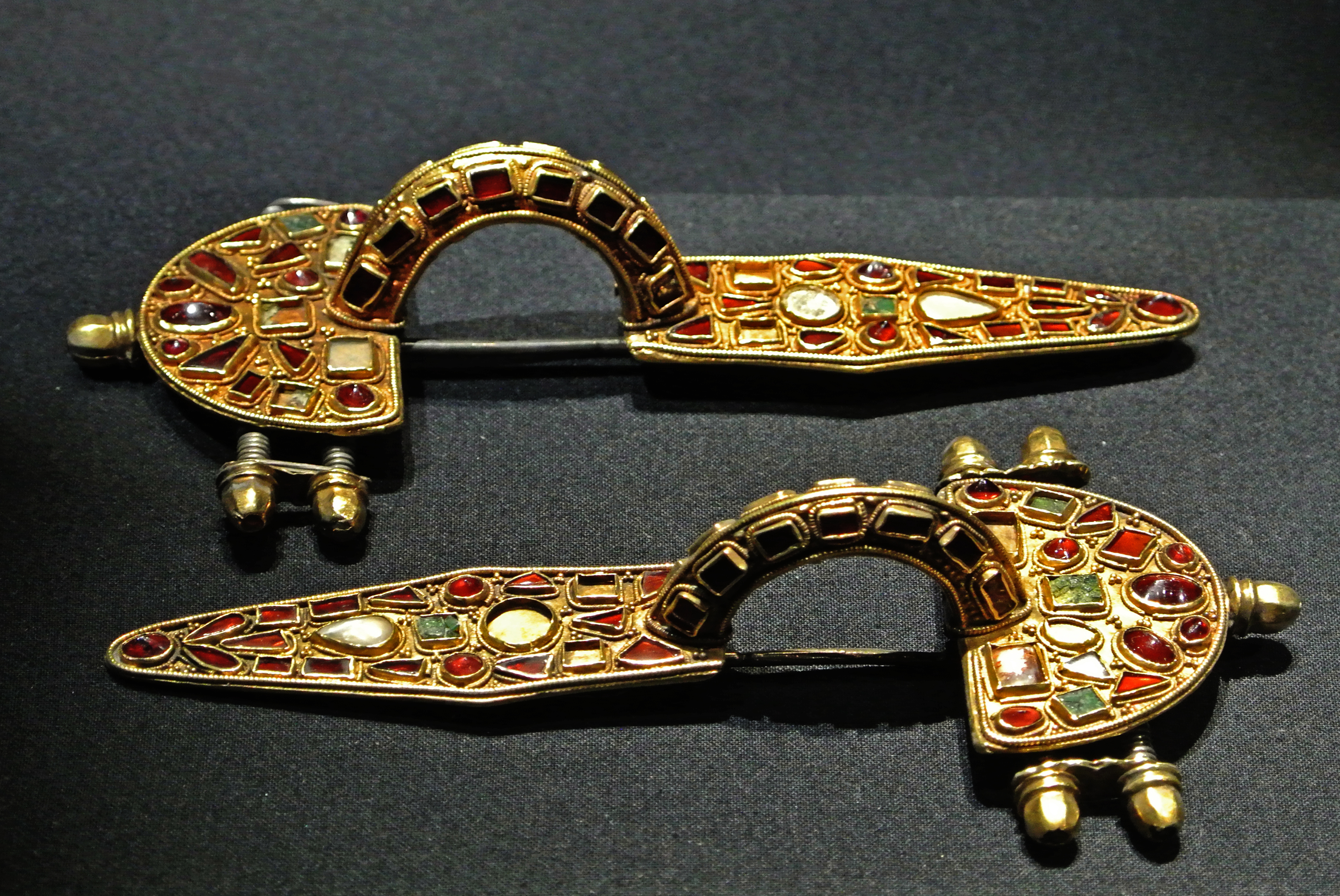
Gothic fibulae, early 5th century

In the 3rd century CE the Roman Empire almost collapsed and the make-up of its army became increasingly Germanic. In the 4th century when the Huns pushed various Germanic tribes westward, some Germanic groups spilled across the Empire's borders and began to settle there. The Visigoths settled in Italy and then in Hispania (Spain), in the north the Franks settled into Gaul and western Germany, and in the 5th century the Angles, Saxons and Jutes invaded Britain, while the Ostrogoths established themselves in Italy. By the close of the 6th century the Western Roman Empire had been almost completely replaced with smaller, less politically-organized, but vigorous Germanic kingdoms.

Although these kingdoms were never homogeneous, they shared certain common cultural features. The new arrivals settled in their new lands and became farmers and fishermen. Archaeological evidence has detected no tradition of monumental artwork, such as architecture or large sculpture in permanent materials, but a preference instead for "mobile" art for personal display, usually also with a practical function, such as weapons, horse-harness, tools, and jewelry which fastened clothes. The surviving art of the Germanic peoples is almost entirely personal adornment and portable. Before conversion to Christianity, artworks were buried with their owners. Much art in organic materials has no doubt not survived.

Three styles dominate Germanic art. The polychrome style originated with the Goths who had settled in the Black Sea area. The animal style, possibly also of eastern origins, flourished in Scandinavia, north Germany and England. Finally, Insular art, or the Hiberno-Saxon style, in a brief but prosperous period after Christianization, saw the fusion of animal style with Celtic, Mediterranean and other motifs and techniques.

== Migration art ==
=== Polychrome style ===
During the 2nd century CE the Goths in the area of present-day Ukraine discovered a newfound taste for gold figurines and objects inlaid with precious stones. This style, borrowed from Scythians and Sarmatians, had some Greco-Roman influences, and was also popular with the Huns. Perhaps the most famous examples are found in the fourth-century Pietroasele treasure (Romania), which includes a great gold eagle brooch (picture). The eagle motif derives from East Asia and results from the participation of the forebears of the Goths in the Hunnic Empire, as in the fourth-century Gothic polychrome eagle-head belt-buckle (picture) from Ukraine.

Goths carried this style to Italy, southern France and Spain. One well-known example is the Ostrogothic eagle (fibula) from Cesena, Italy, now at a museum in Nuremberg. Another is the Visigothic polychrome votive crown (picture) of Recceswinth, King of Toledo, found in a votive crown hoard of c. 670 at Fuente de Guarrazar, near Toledo. The popularity of the style can be attested to by the discovery of a polychrome sword (picture) in the tomb of the Frankish king Childeric I (died c. 481) in Tournai (in present-day Belgium), well north of the Alps.

=== Animal style ===
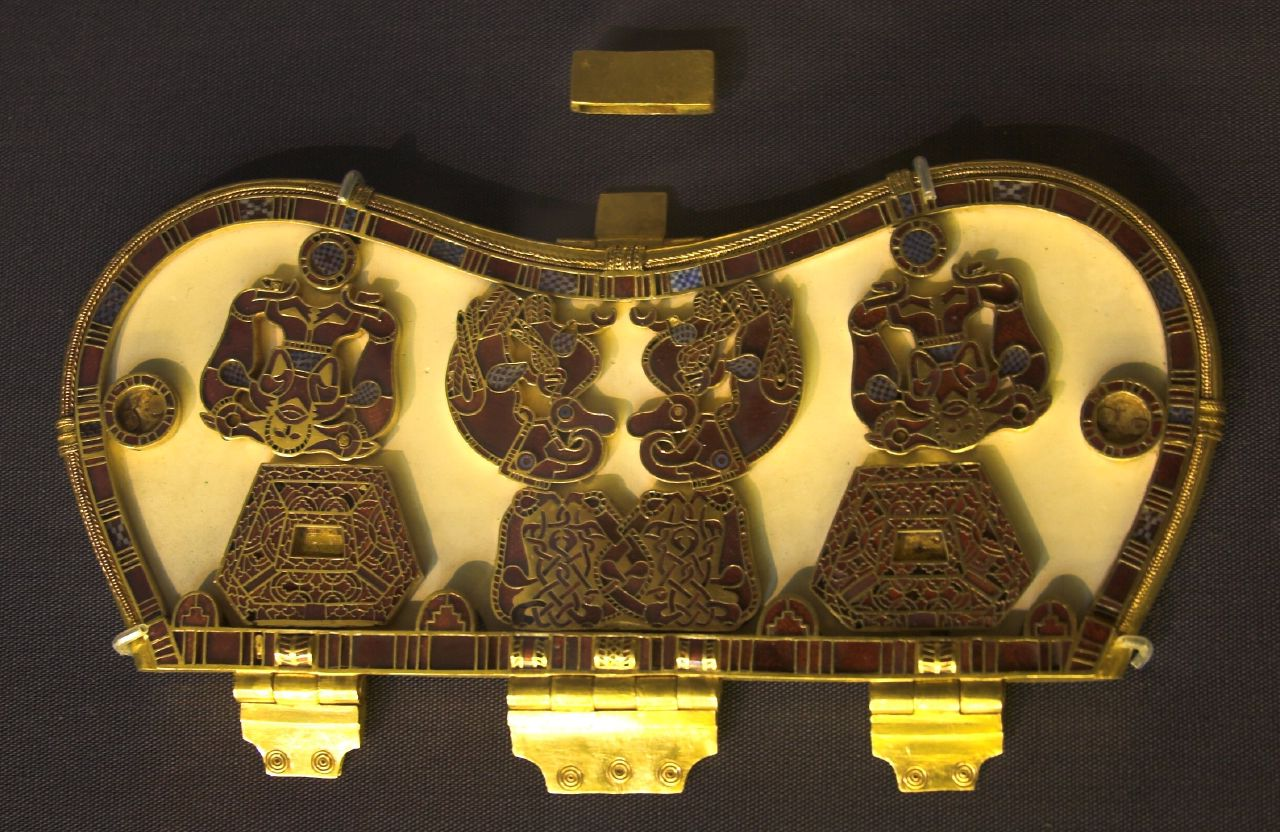
Purse lid from Sutton Hoo, c. 625

The study of Northern European, or "Germanic", zoomorphic decoration was pioneered by Bernhard Salin in a work published in 1904. He classified animal art of the period roughly from 400 to 900 into three phases: Styles I, II and III. The origins of these different phases are still the subject of considerable debate; the development of trends in late-Roman popular art in the provinces is one element, and the older traditions of nomadic Asiatic steppe peoples another. The first two styles are found very widely across Europe in the art of the "barbarian" peoples of the Migration Period.

Style I. First appears in northwest Europe, it became a noticeable new style with the introduction of the chip carving technique applied to bronze and silver in the 5th century. It is characterized by animals whose bodies are divided into sections, and typically appear at the fringes of designs whose main emphasis is on abstract patterns.

Style II. After about 560-570 Style I was in decline and Salin's Style II began to replace it. Style II's animals are whole beasts, but their bodies are elongated into "ribbons" which intertwined into symmetrical shapes with no pretense of naturalism, and rarely any legs, so that they tend to be described as serpents, although the heads often have characteristics of other types of animal. The animal becomes subsumed into ornamental patterns, typically using interlace. Thus two bears are facing each other in perfect symmetry ("confronted"), forming the shape of a heart. Examples of Style II can be found on the gold purse lid.

After about 700 localized styles develop, and it is no longer very useful to talk of a general Germanic style. Salin Style III is found mainly in Scandinavia, and may also be called Viking art.

=== Christian influence ===
Byzantine enameling highly influenced Migration period metalwork. The Church in the early Migration period emerged as the only supranational force in Europe after the collapse of the Roman Empire. It provided a unifying element and was the only institution left that could preserve selected rudiments of classical civilization. As the conversion of Germanic peoples by the end of the 7th centuries in western Europe neared completion, the church became the prime patron for art, commissioning illuminated manuscripts and other liturgical objects. The record shows a steady decline in Germanic forms and increasing Mediterranean influence. This process occurred quickly with the Goths of Italy and Spain and more slowly the further north one looked. This change can be observed in the 8th century Merovingian codex Gelasian Sacramentary, it contained no Style II elements, instead showing Mediterranean examples of fish used to construct large letters at the start of chapters.

== Insular art ==
Insular art, often also known as Hiberno-Saxon art, especially in relation to illuminated manuscripts) was confined to Great Britain and Ireland and was the fusion of Germanic traditions (via the Anglo-Saxons) with Celtic traditions (via Irish monks). It can first be seen in the late 7th century and the style would continue in Britain for about 150 years until the Viking invasions of the 9th century (after which we see the emergence of Anglo-Saxon art), and in Ireland up until the 12th century (after which see Romanesque art).

=== History ===
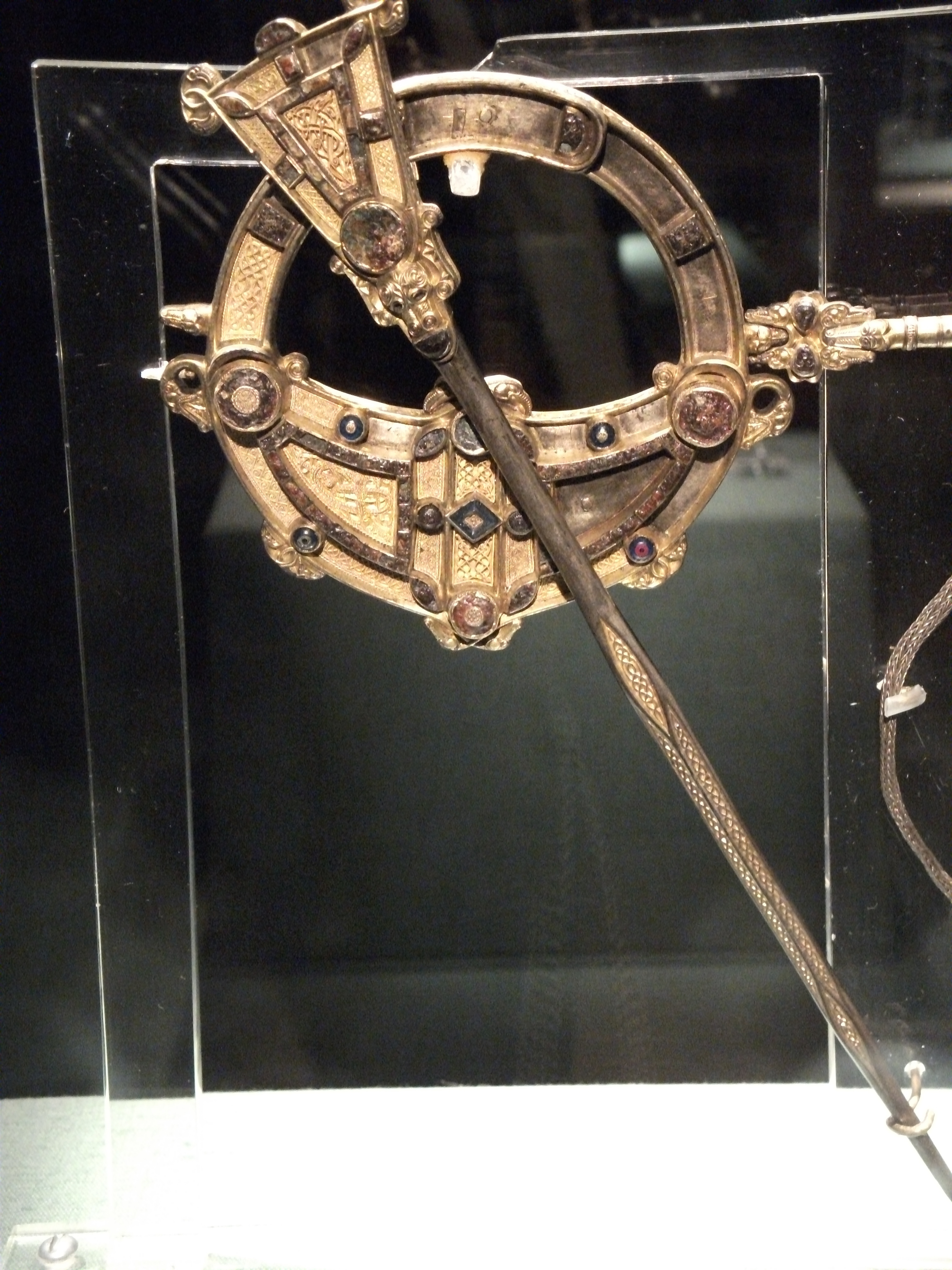
Tara Brooch, front view, early 8th century

Ireland was converted to Christianity by missions from Britain and the continent, beginning in the mid-fifth century, while simultaneously pagan Angles, Saxons and Jutes were settling in England. The extreme political fragmentation of Ireland and its total lack of urban development prevented the emergence of a strong episcopal structure. Monasticism consequently emerged as the dominant force in Irish Christianity, and thus in Irish Christian art.

Celtic Christianity also developed a strong emphasis on missionary activity. Around 563 Saint Columba founded a base on the Scottish island of Iona, from which to convert Pictish pagans in Scotland; this monastic settlement became long remained a key center of Christian culture in northern Britain. Columban monks then went to Northumbria in 635 and founded a monastery on the island of Lindisfarne, from which to convert the north of England. However Rome had already begun the conversion of the Anglo-Saxons from the south with a mission to Kent in 597. Conflict arose between the Irish monks and Rome on the date to celebrate Easter, leading to withdrawal of the Irish mission from Lindisfarne to Iona. However, the widespread use of Irish decorative forms in art produced in England, and vice versa, attests to the continuing importance of interaction between the two cultures. England would come under increasing Mediterranean influence, but not before Irish Celtic and Anglo-Saxon art had profitably fused.

The first major work that can be called purely Hiberno-Saxon is the Book of Durrow in the late 7th century. There followed a golden age in metalworking, manuscripts and stone sculpture. In the 9th century the heyday of the Hiberno-Saxon style neared its end, with the disruptions of Viking raids and the increasing dominance of Mediterranean forms (see Anglo-Saxon art).

=== Illuminated manuscripts ===
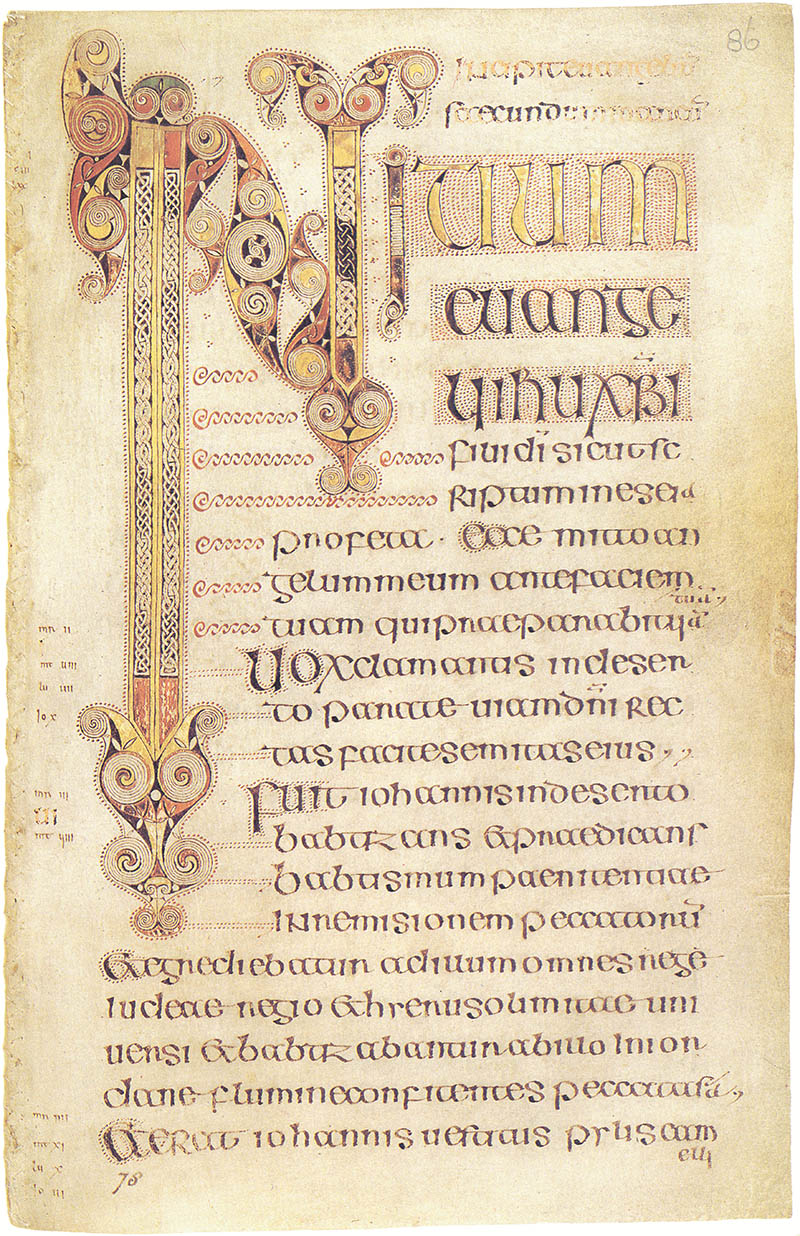
Book of Durrow, 7th century Ireland. One of the earliest pieces of Hiberno-Saxon art. Trinity College Library, Dublin.

The surviving evidence of Irish Celtic art from the Iron Age period is dominated by metalwork in a La Tène style. Hanging bowls such as those found at Sutton Hoo are among some of the most important of these crafts. As Irish missionaries began to spread the word of the Gospels they needed books, and almost from the start, they began to embellish their texts with artwork drawing from the designs of these metalworking traditions. The spirals and scrolls in the enlarged opening letters—found in the earliest manuscripts such as the 7th century Cathach of St. Columba manuscript—borrows in style directly from Celtic enamels and La Tène metalworking motifs.

After the Cathach of St. Columba, book decoration became increasingly more complex and new styles from other cultures were introduced. Carpet pages—entire pages of ornamentation with no text—were inserted, usually at the start of each Gospel. The geometric motifs and interlaced patterns may have been influences from Coptic Egypt or elsewhere in the Byzantine Middle East. The increasing use of animal ornamentation was an Anglo-Saxon contribution of its animal style. All of these influences and traditions combined into what could be called a new Hiberno-Saxon style, with the Book of Durrow in the later 7th century being the first of its type. The Lindisfarne Gospels is another famous example.

The Book of Kells was probably created in Iona in the 8th century. When the monks fled to Ireland in the face of Viking raids in 807, they probably brought it with them to Kells in Ireland. It is the most richly decorated of the Hiberno-Saxon manuscripts and represents a large array of techniques and motifs created during the 8th century.

=== Metalworking ===
In the 7th century there emerged a resurgence of metalworking with new techniques such as gold filigree that allowed ever smaller and more detailed ornamentations, especially on the penannular and pseudo-penannular Celtic brooches that were important symbols of status for the elite, and also worn by clergy as part of their vestments. The Tara Brooch and Ardagh Hoard are among the most magnificent Insular examples, whilst the 7th century royal jewelry from the Sutton Hoo ship burial shows a Pre-Christian Anglo-Saxon style. They brought together all of the available skills of the goldsmith in one piece: ornamentation applied to a variety of techniques and materials, chip carving, filigree, cloisonné and rock crystal.

=== Stone sculpture ===
The skills displayed in metalworking can be seen in stone sculptures. For many centuries it had been Irish custom to display a large wooden cross inside the monastic building enclosure. These were then translated into stone crosses called high crosses and covered with the same intricate patterns used by goldsmiths, and often figure sculptures.

== See also ==
- Anglo-Saxon art, from the Migration period to the 1066 Norman Conquest
- Confronted-animals, ancient motif where two animals face each other in a symmetrical pose
- Hercules' Club (amulet), Roman Empire and Migration-era artefact type
- Iberian pre-Romanesque art and architecture, a regional type of ~
- Viking art of the Viking Age (8th-11th c.)
