= Erich Auerbach (photographer) =

Erich Auerbach (12 December 1911, Sokolov, now the Czech Republic – 11 August 1977, London) was a foremost Czech journalist photographer working for the weekly Pestrý týden and was the official photographer of the Czechoslovak government in exile during World War II.

== Career ==
Some of his most iconic photographs were published in Prague in 2005, as a historical record of the BBC broadcasts made by Foreign Minister Jan Masaryk during his wartime exile in London: "Volá Londýn" (London Calling).

After the war, he continued working in London to become a recognised photographer of musicians and artists in general. During a brief return to Prague, he documented the lives of British wartime brides of Czech soldiers as they adapted to a foreign culture, using Patricia, wife of Josef Josten, as one of his models.

While in London he worked for Sunday Times, Daily Herald, The Observer or EMI Records. He is the author of well-known photographs of Leonard Bernstein, Henry Wood, Pablo Casals, Igor Stravinski or Jacqueline du Pre now owned by the Hulton Archives of Getty Images.

== Collections ==
- Getty Images: artist and musicians photographs from after the war period.
- Czech Foreign Ministry still owns a large collection of his war photographs.
- National Portrait Gallery in London also owns several of his photographs

== Bibliography ==
- Erich Auerbach: Volá Londýn London calling, Prague 2005
- Erich Auerbach: An Eye for Music, London 1971
