= František Drtikol =

Czech photographer (1883–1961)

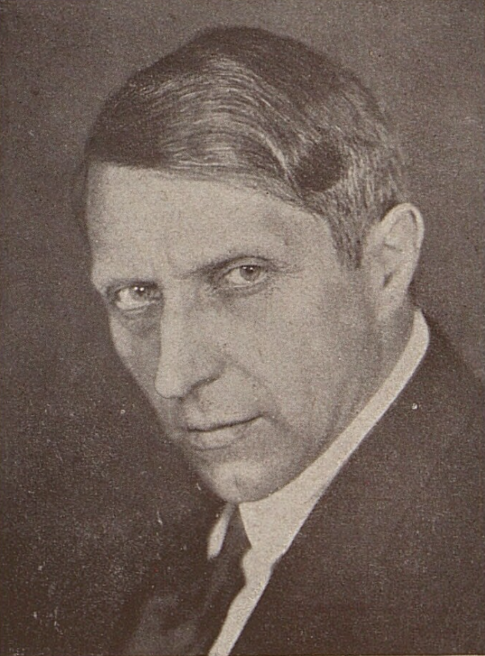
- Drtikol in 1927
- Born: 3 March 1883; Příbram, Austria-Hungary
- Died: 13 January 1961 (aged 77); Prague, Czechoslovakia
- Resting place: Příbram
- Occupations: Photographer, painter
- Years active: 1901–1935 (photography); 1935–1961 (painting)
- Known for: Nude photography, portrait photography
- Spouses: Ervín Kupferova (m. 1921; div. 1926) Jarmila Rambouskova (m. 1942; died 1959)
- Children: 1 daughter

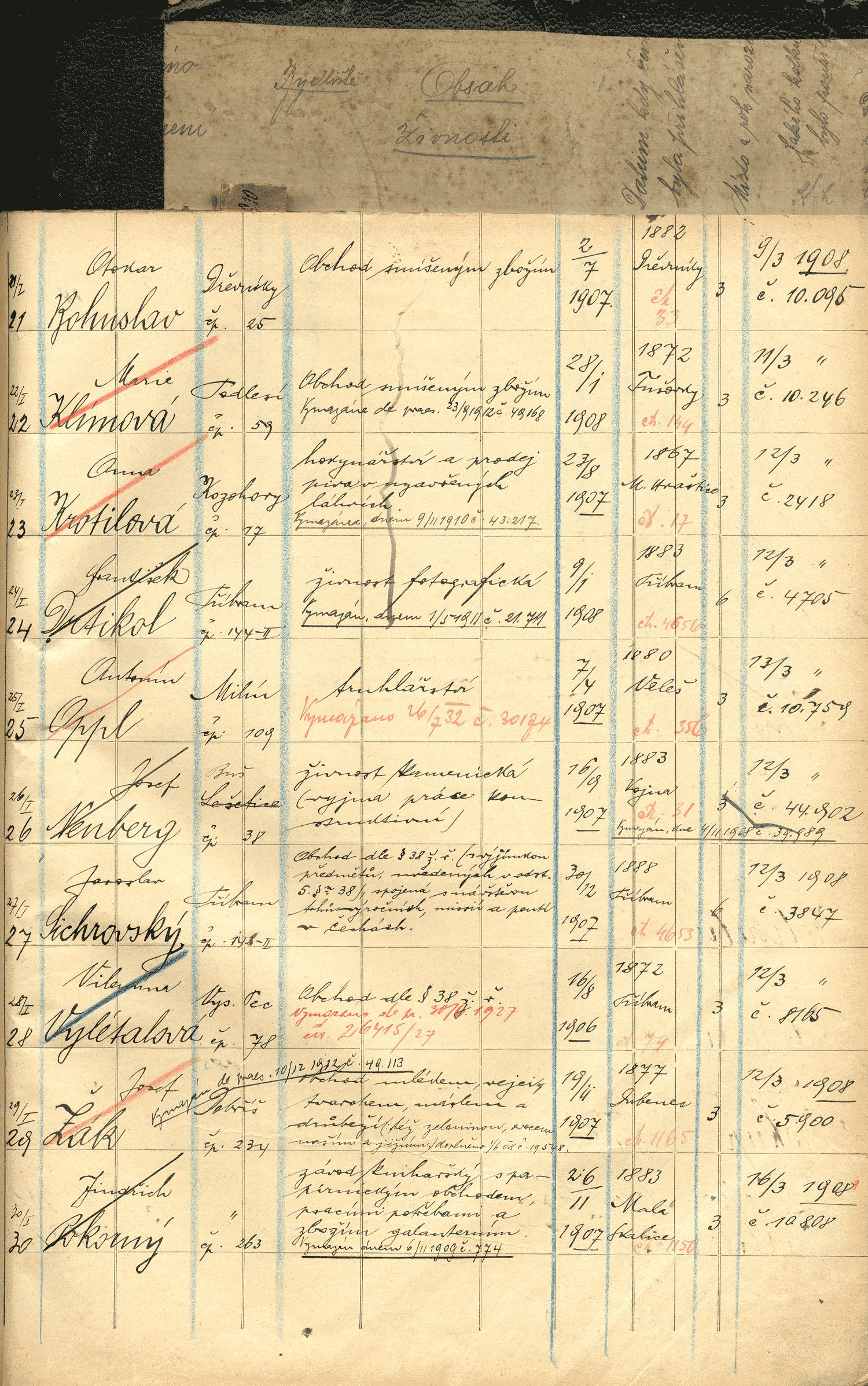
Trade register entry of František Drtikol, 1908 (SOkA Příbram)

František Drtikol (3 March 1883 – 13 January 1961) was a Czech photographer known for his nudes and portraits.

== Life and work ==
Drtikol was born in Příbram into a merchant family, the younger of three children, brother of sisters, Ema and Maria. He was married twice: in 1921-1926 to Ervín Kupferova, with whom he had a daughter, and then in 1942-1959 (until her death) to Jarmila Rambouskova.

As a young man he wanted to be a painter, but his father directed him to train for a less precarious career as a photographer. In 1901, aged 18 and after an apprenticeship, he enrolled in the Teaching and Research Institute of Photography in Munich, a city which was major centre of Symbolism and Art Nouveau and which was influential on his career. From 1907 to 1910 he had his own studio in Příbram, but had little success. In 1910 he relocated to Prague, where he established a portrait studio on the fourth floor of a Baroque corner house at 9 Vodičkova, now demolished. In Prague he made many portraits of notable cultural figures.

In the 1920s and 1930s, Drtikol received significant awards at international photo salons. He was a contributor to the illustrated weekly Pestrý týden. Jaroslav Rössler, an important avant-garde photographer, was one of his pupils.

Drtikol's portraits and nudes show development from pictorialism and symbolism to modern compositions in which the nude body is juxtaposed with large geometric structures and thrown shadows. These are reminiscent of Cubism, and at the same time his nudes suggest the kind of movement that was characteristic of the Futurist aesthetic.

He began using plywood figures in a period he called "photopurism". The resulting images resembled silhouettes of the human form. In the final stage of his photographic work Drtikol created compositions of little carved figures, with elongated shapes, symbolically expressing various themes from Buddhism. In 1935 he gave up photography and concentrated on painting, Buddhist religious and philosophical systems.

Drtikol died in Prague on 13 January 1961. A collection of some 20,000 of his prints is in the Museum of Decorative Arts in Prague.

== Publications ==
- Z dvorků a dvorečků staré Prahy (From the Courtyards and Yards of Old Prague; 1911);
- Le nus de Drtikol (1929);
- Žena ve světle (Woman in the Light; Prague, 1938).

== Bibliography ==
- Fárová, Anna (1986). František Drtikol: Photograph des Art Deco. München: Schirmer/Mosel. ISBN 978-3-88814-159-1.
- Birgus, Vladimír (1997). František Drtikol: Modernist Nudes. San Francisco: Robert Koch Gallery. ISBN 978-0-929196-02-2.
- Birgus, Vladimír; Mlčoch, Jan (2001). Akt in Czech Photography. Prague: Kant. ISBN 978-80-86217-35-2.
- Bertolotti, Alessandro (2007). Books of Nudes. New York: Abrams. ISBN 978-0-8109-9444-7.
- Doleža, Stanislav; Fárová, Anna; Nedoma, Petr (1998). František Drtikol: fotograf, malíř, mystik. Praha: Galerie Rudolfinum. ISBN 978-80-902194-4-1.
- Funk, Karel (2001). Mystik a učitel František Drtikol: Pokyny pro duchovní cestu. Olomouc: Fontána. ISBN 978-80-86179-55-1.
- Mlčoch, Jan (1999). František Drtikol: Fotografie 1901–1914. Praha: KANT. OCLC 921287753.
