= Karel Cudlín =

Czech photographer (born 1960)

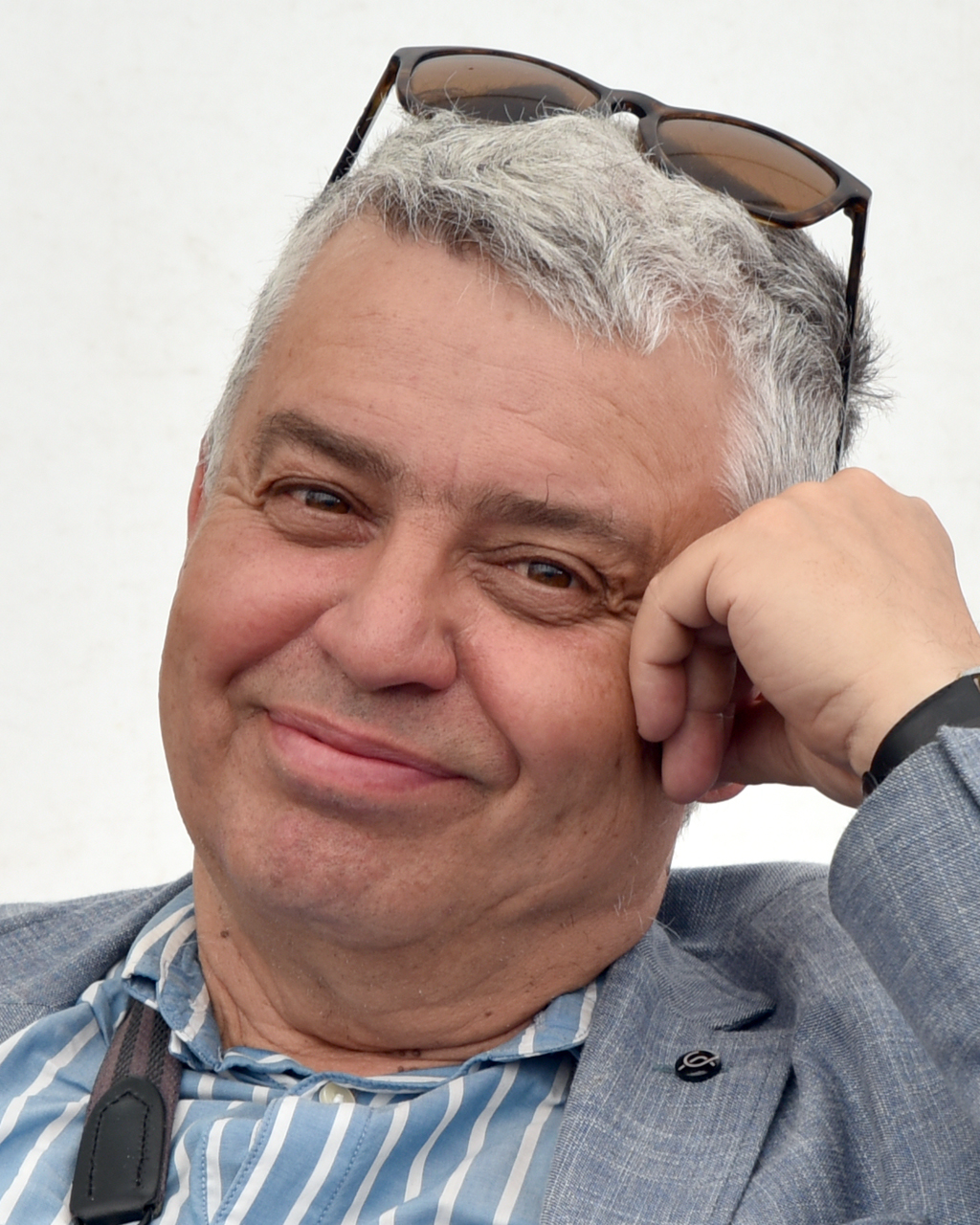
Karel Cudlín (2022)

Karel Cudlín (born 28 June 1960) is a Czech photographer.

== Career ==
Cudlín was born in Prague and started taking photographs in his teens. Borrowing his father's Exakta and supported by his uncle, a photography enthusiast, Cudlín soon started photographing the Romani people of Žižkov, the suburb where he lived. Cudlín attended a social work school that, combined with a short stint in a low-grade job, provided him with the proletarian credentials needed to join the Fotografia cooperative. The cooperative sent him to a ballroom in the Lucerna area where he overcame considerable technical difficulties in photographing young people at night. A third area that he explored was Communist Party rituals.

After a year at Lidová škola umění, Cudlín was in 1983 admitted to FAMU, which was very free by Czechoslovak standards of the time. He graduated in 1987, and soon found work at the weekly Mladý svět. During the summer of 1989, Cudlín made a cycle of photographs depicting East Germans escaping from their country with the help of the West German embassy in Prague. Following the Velvet Revolution and subsequent democratization of Czechoslovakia, he embarked on a series of relationships with other Czechoslovak media sources, among them the newspapers Prostor and Lidové noviny and the ČTA agency. After ČTA closed in 1996, Cudlín became a freelance photographer. Additionally, he has worked as one of the personal photographers of the former Czech President Václav Havel.

Cudlín's new themes included refugees, Israel, the lingering Soviet forces within Czechoslovakia, Valdice prison, and, by accident, Ukraine (a putsch had interrupted Cudlín and Vojta Dukát's plan to go to Moscow). He has continued with a small number of long-term projects (Ukrainian workers in Prague, hypermarkets), photographed in black and white.

== Awards ==
Cudlín has won seven awards in the major photographic competition in the Czech Republic, Czech Press Photo.

== Books of Cudlín's works ==
- Photographie. Prague: Torst, 1994.
- (With Jindřich Marco.) Izrael (50). Prague: Argo, 1998. ISBN 80-7203-183-X.
- Silverio, Robert. Karel Cudlín. Prague: Torst, 2001. ISBN 80-7215-148-7 Text in Czech and English.
- (With Pavla Jazairiová.) Izrael a Palestina, Palestina a Izrael. V Praze: Radioservis, 2001. ISBN 80-86212-18-1.
- (With Tomki Němec.) Havel - fotografie = Havel - photographs. Liberec: Knihy 555, 2002. ISBN 80-86660-03-6.
- (With Monika MacDonagh-Pajerová.) Portrét české společnosi na prahu Evropy = Portrait of Czech society in the threshold of Europe. Brno: Petrov, 2004. ISBN 80-7227-190-3.
