= Jiří Jeníček =

Czech photographer and filmmaker

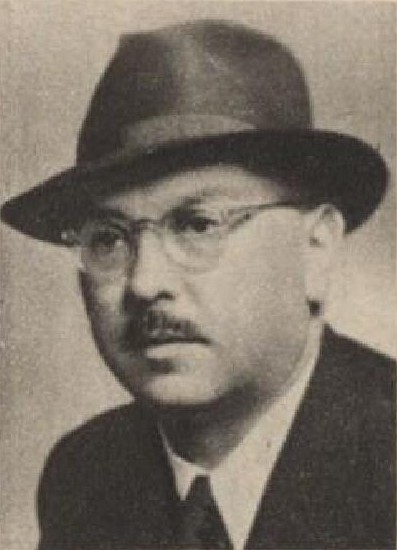
Jiří Jeníček

Jiří Jeníček (8 March 1895 in Beroun – 22 February 1963 in Prague) was a Czech photographer and filmmaker. He is also the writer of theoretical works in both areas.

He is known for his film-making for Czechoslovak Army in the 1930s and also photographed for the illustrated weekly Pestrý týden. He was Director of the Film Department of the Ministry of National Defense in post-World-War II Czechoslovakia.
