= Miroslav Hák =

Czech photographer (1911–1978)

Miroslav Hák (9 May 1911 – 29 June 1978) was a Czech photographer. He was one of the members of Group 42.

== Life ==
Miroslav Hák was born on 9 May 1911 in Nová Paka, Bohemia, Austria-Hungary. He was one of the most outstanding figures in the history of Czech modern photography and ranked among the innerly rich and actually never fully recognized and recognizable personalities in the sphere of art. He studied under his father, the photographer František Hák. Between 1925 and 1931 Hák worked as a photographer in Prague on publications including Pestrý týden and in Bratislava.

In 1937 he joined the avant-garde D34 Theatre of Prague as a photographer and from 1940, he worked in the film industry.

Between 1942 and 1948, Hák associated with the Prague-based Group 42, which united avant-garde Czech photographers. From 1954 he served as a photographer at the Institute of Art Theory and History of the Czechoslovak Academy of Sciences.

Hák died on 29 June 1978 in Prague.

== Bibliography ==
- Jan Kříže: Miroslav Hák, Pressfoto, Prague, 1981, Evid. číslo: 31238-6257
- Jiří Kolář: Miroslav Hák, fotografie z let 1940–1958, edice Umělecké fotografie, svazek 2, SNKLHU, Prague, 1959
