= Bohumil Šťastný =

Czech photojournalist

Bohumil Šťastný (15 June 1905, in Prague – 15 June 1991, in Prague) was a Czech photojournalist, a founder of Czech photojournalism. He concentrated mainly on photographic essays, but he created also still-lifes, portraits, photographs of architecture and advertising photographs. Since the 1930s he was one of the pioneers of the technique of the color photography. He used also some elements of the avant-garde methods in his works.

== Biography ==
Šťastný studied at the Střední průmyslová škola grafická in Prague, and after he finished his studies, he worked at the Barrandov Studios. Since 1926 he worked as a photographer for the journal Pestrý týden. In the editorial team of Pestrý týden he collaborated with Milena Jesenská, Adolf Hoffmeister, Bohumil Markalous and others. Šťastný simultaneously documented Prague culture life, exhibitions etc. Since 1928 he devoted himself to medical photography.

During the World War II Šťastný photographed locations of German weapons V-1 and helped to inform Czechoslovak exile government in London. He also helped with documentation of the Prague uprising, his photographs of that event were published in 1946 in the book The New Vision by László Moholy-Nagy. Pestrý týden quit all activities in May 1945.

Bohumil Šťastný was a member of the Czech Photographic Society and from 1932 to 1948 he was a chairman of that institution. He died in Prague on 15 July 1991.
