= Štoky =

- Market town
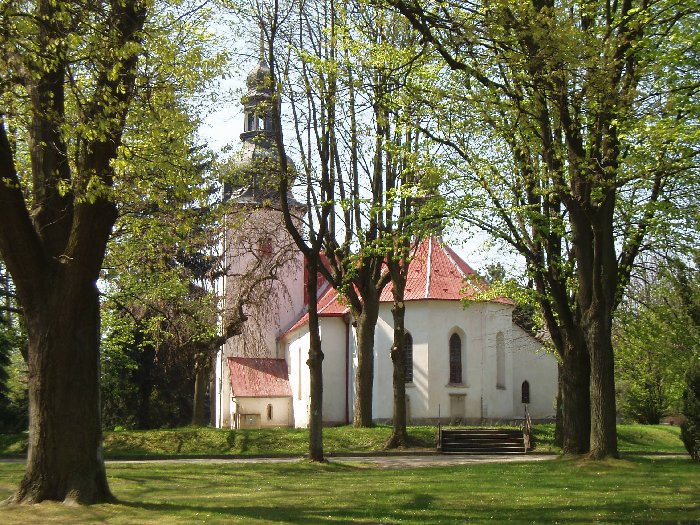
- Church of Saint James the Great

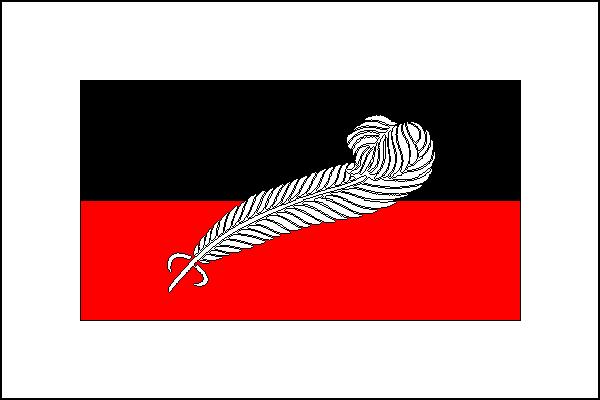
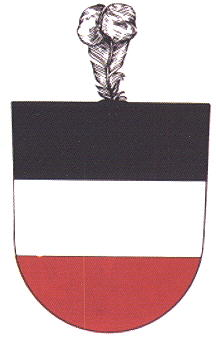
- Flag Coat of arms

- Location in the Czech Republic
- Coordinates: 49°30′9″N 15°35′19″E
- Country: Czech Republic
- Region: Vysočina
- District: Havlíčkův Brod
- First mentioned: 1347

Area
  - Total: 39.69 km^{2} (15.32 sq mi)
- Elevation: 518 m (1,699 ft)

Population (2026-01-01)
  - Total: 1,980
  - Density: 49.9/km^{2} (129/sq mi)
- Time zone: UTC+1 (CET)
  - Summer (DST): UTC+2 (CEST)
- Postal code: 582 53
- Website: www.stoky.cz

Štoky (Czech pronunciation: [ˈʃtokɪ]; German: Stecken) is a market town in Havlíčkův Brod District in the Vysočina Region of the Czech Republic. It has about 2,000 inhabitants.

== Administrative division ==
Štoky consists of five municipal parts (in brackets population according to the 2021 census):

- Štoky (1,511)
- Petrovice (107)
- Pozovice (97)
- Smilov (110)
- Studénka (78)

== Etymology ==
The name Štoky is derived from the Middle High German word stoc, i.e. 'tree stump'.

== Geography ==
Štoky is located about 11 kilometres (7 mi) south of Havlíčkův Brod and 10 km (6 mi) north of Jihlava. It lies on the border between the Křemešník Highlands and Upper Sázava Hills. The highest point is at 676 m (2,218 ft) above sea level.

== History ==
The first written mention of Štoky is from 1347. From 1436 to 1596, it was owned by the Trčka of Lípa family. Sometime during their rule, the village was promoted to a market town. Štoky was devastated during the Thirty Years' War, but soon it recovered and crafts flourished. The next period of prosperity came around 1760, when the Vienna–Prague road was being built.

== Demographics ==
Historical population

Year	Pop.	±%
1869	2,496	—
1880	2,719	+8.9%
1890	2,450	−9.9%
1900	2,331	−4.9%
1910	2,244	−3.7%

Year	Pop.	±%
1921	2,286	+1.9%
1930	2,129	−6.9%
1950	1,668	−21.7%
1961	1,803	+8.1%
1970	1,638	−9.2%

Year	Pop.	±%
1980	1,542	−5.9%
1991	1,492	−3.2%
2001	1,475	−1.1%
2011	1,738	+17.8%
2021	1,903	+9.5%

Source: Censuses

== Transport ==
The D1 motorway from Prague to Brno runs through the southern part of the municipal territory. The I/38 road from Jihlava to Havlíčkův Brod runs through the market town proper.

== Sights ==
The main landmark of Štoky is the Church of Saint James the Great, built in the Gothic style.

The Church of the Exaltation of the Holy Cross is located in Petrovice. It was built in the late Baroque style in 1799 and has also Neoclasical elements.

== Notable people ==
- Jaroslav Rössler (1902–1990), photographer
