= Jaroslav Rössler =

Czech photographer (1902–1990)

Jaroslav Rössler, self-portrait (1924)

Jaroslav Rössler (25 May 1902 – 5 January 1990) was a Czech photographer. He was a pioneer of Czech avant-garde photography and a member of the association of Czech avant-garde artists Devětsil.

== Biography ==
Rössler was born on 25 May 1902 in Smilov. He was born to the Czech-German father, Eduard Rössler, and a Czech mother, Adéla Nollová. From 1917 to 1920, Rössler studied in the atelier of the company owned by renowned Czech photographer František Drtikol. Subsequently, he worked with the company as a laboratory technician. As a 21 years old, he began collaboration with the art theorist Karel Teige, who assigned him to create typographic layout for magazines Pásmo, Disk, Stavba and ReD (Revue Devětsilu). While working on these tasks, Rössler deepened his knowledge of photographic methods. In his works he utilized and combined the techniques of photogram, photomontage, collage and drawing. The beginnings of his photographic work were influenced by Cubism and Futurism, but he also attempted to create the first abstract photographs. In 1923, he became a member of the avant-garde association Devětsil.

In 1925, he went on a six-month study visit to Paris. The same year he began working as a photographer in the Osvobozené divadlo in Prague. Before his second departure to Paris, he co-worked as a commercial photographer with the pictorial magazine Pestrý týden.

In 1927, Rössler moved to Paris together with his wife, Gertruda Fischerová (1894–1976). Initially, he focused on commercial photography. He collaborated with the experimental studio of Lucien Lorell, and worked on commissions for notable companies such as Michelin and Shell. However, later he found an interest in the "street life" of Paris, which influenced his future stay in the city. During a demonstration, he encountered the protesters and took photographs of the event. Shortly after that he was arrested, and after a six-month imprisonment he was expelled from the country, in 1935. The alleged reason for his expulsion was his German-sounding surname.

After his return from Paris, Rössler and his wife resided in Prague-Žižkov. He opened a small photographic atelier, but difficulties associated with the management of the studio caused a significant gap in his artistic work, lasting for almost two decades.

In the 1950s, he resumed his previous activities and again began experimenting with the camera and photographic techniques. He created so-called "prizmata" (prisms), photographs taken through a birefringent prism. Additionally, he experimented with solarisation and explored the possibilities of the Sabatier effect.

Rössler died on 5 January 1990 in Prague, at the age of 87.

== Legacy ==
Jaroslav Rössler, together with František Drtikol, Josef Sudek and Jaromír Funke, is today considered an important exponent of Czech modern photography and avant-garde art.

== Selected exhibitions ==
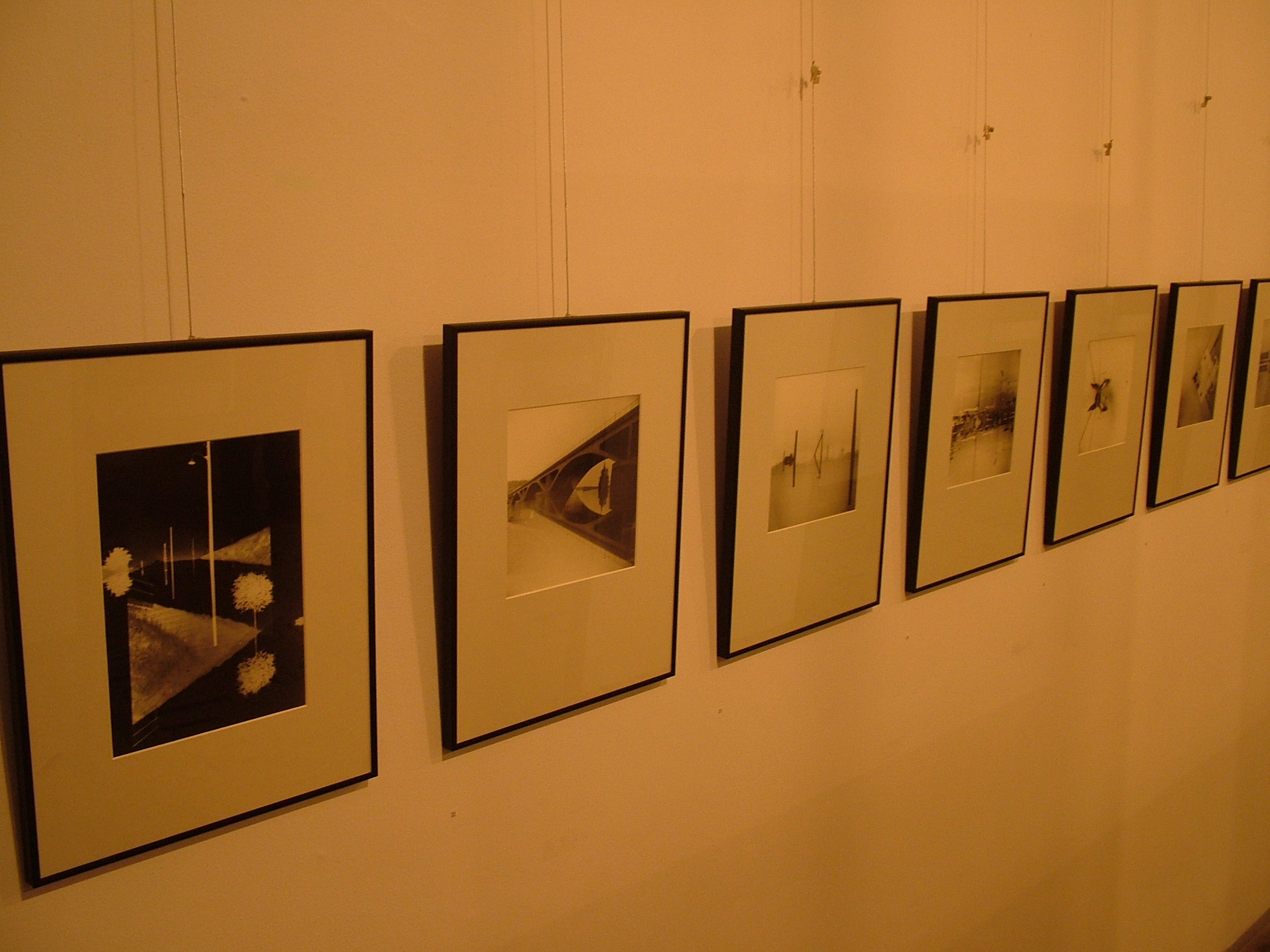
Jaroslav Rössler, an exhibition in the Louvre Gallery, Prague, 2009.

- Objevy Jaroslava Rösslera (2008–2009), Louvre Gallery, Prague
- Jaroslav Rössler: Experimentální fotografie (2006), Caspari Centrum (Prague)
- Jan Patrik - Jaroslav Rössler - Andreas Sterzing (2005–2006), Caspari Centrum (Prague)
- Jaroslav Rössler: Abstraktní fotografie 1923–1978 (2005), Galerie Art (Chrudim)
- Jaroslav Rössler: Zrcadlení (2005), Ateliér Josefa Sudka (Prague)
- Jaroslav Rössler: Experimenty 50.-70. let (2004), Ateliér Josefa Sudka (Prague)
- Jaroslav Rössler: Rané abstrakce (2003), Ateliér Josefa Sudka (Prague)
- Jaroslav Rössler: Raná abstrakce – Světelné experimenty 20. let (2003), Ateliér Josefa Sudka (Prague)
- Jaroslav Rössler: Vzpomínka na avantgardu (2002), České centrum fotografie (Prague)
- Jaroslav Rössler: Fotografovo pařížské období (1925-1935) (2001), Francouzský institut (Prague)
- Jaroslav Rössler: Fotografie, koláže, kresby (2001), Uměleckoprůmyslové museum (Prague)
- Jaroslav Rössler (2000–2001), České centrum fotografie (Prague)

== Selected bibliography ==
- Moucha, Josef; et al. (2005). Jaroslav Rössler: abstraktní fotografie (Abstract Photography, 1923-1978). Chrudim: Galerie Art.
- Birgus, Vladimír; Mlčoch, Jan (2004). Jaroslav Rössler - Czech Avant-Garde Photographer. Prague: Kant. ISBN 978-0-262-02557-7.
- Birgus, Vladimír (2001). Jaroslav Rössler. Prague: (Torst) FotoTorst. ISBN 978-80-7215-139-4.
- Moucha, Josef (2014). Avantgardní fotograf - Jaroslav Rössler - Avant-Garde Photographer (in Czech and English). Prague: Karel Koutský - Fotorenesance. ISBN 9788090576308.
