= Artia (publisher) =

Defunct Czech publishing house

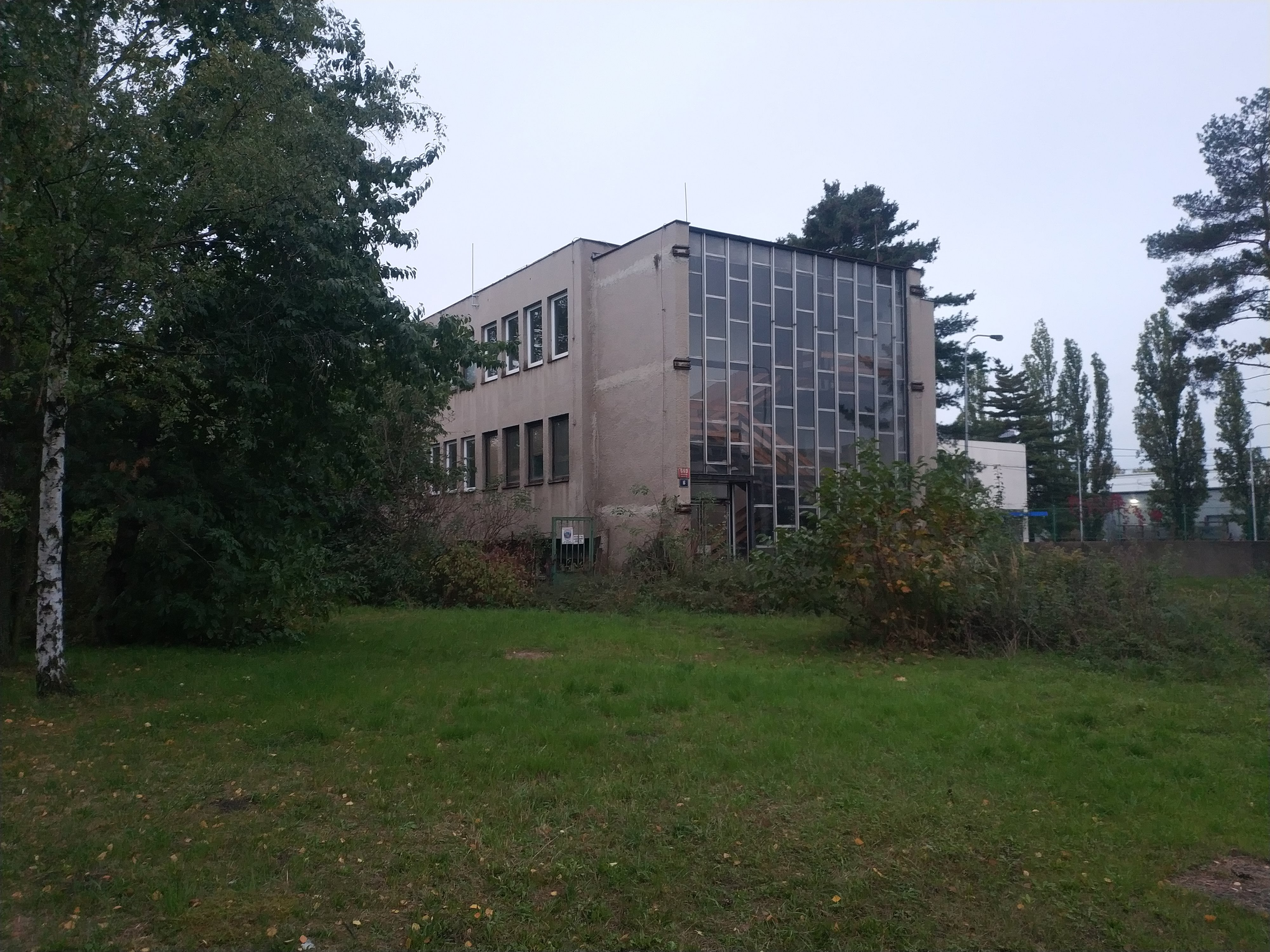
- Former Artia office in Prague
- Status: Dissolved
- Founded: 1952
- Defunct: 1994
- Country of origin: Czechoslovakia
- Headquarters location: Prague
- Publication types: Children's books

PZO Artia was a Cold War-era government-run company in Prague, Czechoslovakia, that was best known for publishing books of fairy tales for children.

== History ==
PZO (Czech: Podnik zahraničního obchodu, literally “Abroad Trade Enterprise”, aka “Unitary Enterprise”) Artia was originally founded as a stock company for import and export of cultural goods, but transformed into a PZO in 1953 as the Czechoslovak cultural goods import/export monopolist, later incorporating a publishing house as well. In the fifteen years to 1967, Artia published 3,000 titles and books on "art, general books, [popular] science literature and children's books" were exported to "26 countries in 17 languages".

In addition to its book publishing activities, Artia was involved in the export of "periodicals, music, records, gramophones, works of art, postage stamps, coins, teaching aids, antiquities, Bohemian garnets, cartographic products, silver costume jewellery, folk art, and ... musical instruments".

From the 1950s Artia exported long-playing records to foreign countries released by the state-owned record label Supraphon (mostly classical music, but also pop, jazz, folk music and the spoken word) and occasionally those released by Panton.

The British publisher Paul Hamlyn was granted exclusive rights to sell Artia's English-language publications in the United Kingdom. Czechoslovak printers and publishers in the 1950s and 1960s had a reputation for fine gravure colour printing using four-colour offset machinery. In 1960 Hamlyn published Cookery in Colour designed in-house by his firm and printed by Artia in Czechoslovakia. The first printing sold 50,000 copies and was reprinted "several times annually for many years".

Artia also designed and produced books, mainly reprints and including coffee table books offered at affordable prices, for Spring Books, of London, an imprint of the Paul Hamlyn Group.

Artia designed and produced a number of series for the British publisher, Bancroft & Co. (Publishers) Ltd., of London. Those series were printed in Czechoslovakia and included Westminster Books and the pop-up book series Panascopic Model Books.

The enterprise became obsolete with the political changes in Czechoslovakia and in all other COMECON countries around 1990, and was liquidated in 1994.

== Select bibliography of books published by Artia ==
- Moskau, Jan Lukas, 1962.
- Prager Alltag, Erich Einhorn and Jan Zelenka, 1958.
- Prehistoric Animals, Josef Augusta, illustrated by Zdenek Burian, ca. 1960.
- Indische Miniaturen der lokalen Schulen, Dr. Lubor Hájek, Photographien und graphishe Gestaltung von W. und B. Forman, 1961.

== Book series ==
- Artia Filmmärchen
- Artia Pocket Series
- Children's Series Artia (or: Artia Children's Series)
- Field Guide Series
- Folk Art Series
- Märchen der Welt
- Musica Antiqua Bohemica - editions of sheet music published under name of "Editio Artia" and sometimes jointly with firms such as Supraphon, the Státní hudební vydavatelství (SHV) (English, "State Music Publishing House") or the Společnost Antonína Dvořáka: Státní nakladatelství krásné literatury, hudby a umění (English, "Antonín Dvořák Society: State Publishing House of Fine Literature, Music and Art")
- Natur in Farbe
- Neue Horizonte: Populärwissenschaftliche Reihe (jointly published with Verlag der Tschechoslowakischen Akademie der Wissenschaften)
- New Horizons (jointly published with Publishing House of the Czechoslovak Academy of Sciences)

== Sound recordings series ==
- Artia International Opera Series
- Golden Series
- Great Artists Series
