= Photographic Center of Skopelos =

Defunct museum in Skopelos, Greece

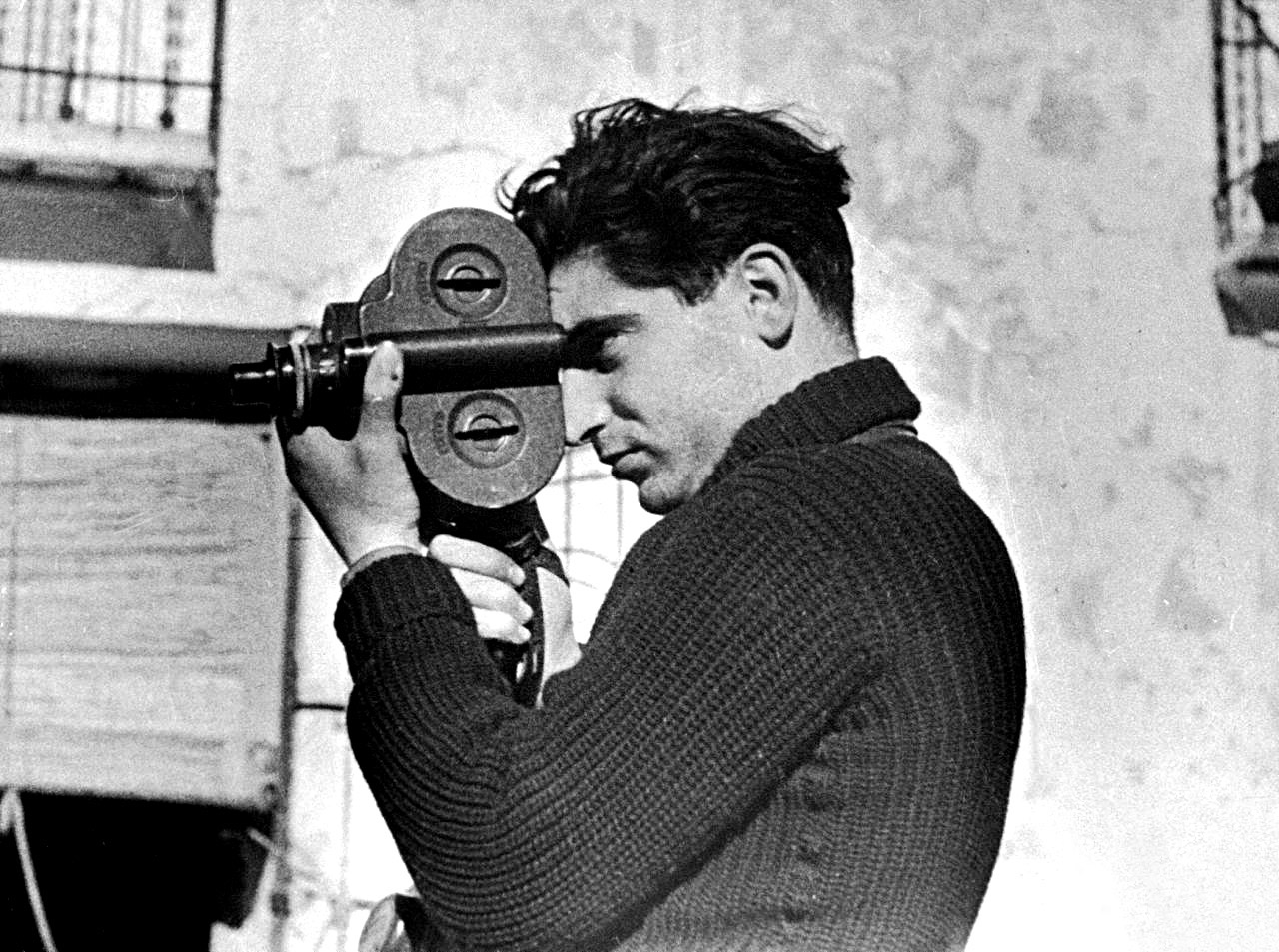
The museum has showcased a number of images by photographers such as Robert Capa

Museum of Photography of Skopelos, also known as the Photographic Center of Skopelos, was a museum and seasonal exhibition venue in Skopelos, the Sporades, Greece. It hosted workshops and significant retrospectives of the work of photographers Robert Capa, Herbert List and Josef Koudelka, among others.

== History ==
The nonprofit organization was founded in 1995 by focusing in particular on Eastern European photography. In 1996 a photography festival was held, and 178 images by the noted Czech photographer Josef Koudelka were shown, who was famous for his photography of the Soviet invasion of Prague.

After a few lean years, the Center gained permanent government funding in 2005 after the curator, Vangelis Ioakeimidis had joined with Thessaloniki's Photography Museum to help funding.

== Displays ==
The center has made a notable showcase of "Icons of Narcissus" of images dating to around 1900. These were imported from the Musee Nicephore Niepce in Chalon-sur-Saône, France and a French foundation, the FRAC, has also made contributions to the museum. Other exhibitions have contained works by renowned Greek photographers such as Costas Balafas, Dimitris Letsios, Vassilis Manikakis, Spyros Meletzis, Aimilios Serafis and Takis Tloupas. Photographers from the Public Power Corporation (DEI) archives have also had imagery exhibited in Skopelos.
