= List of museums in Nuremberg =

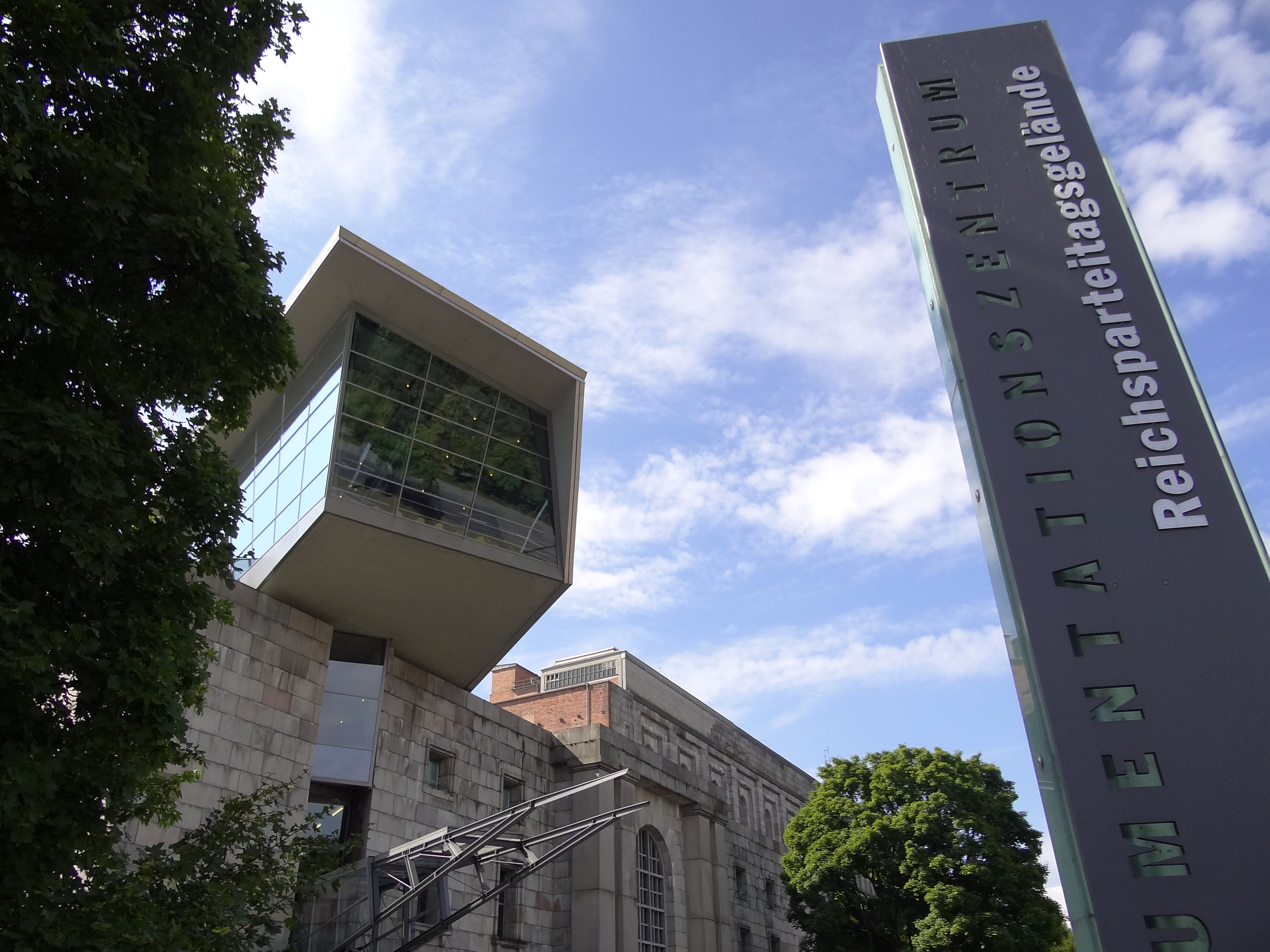
Entrance of the Documentation Center Nazi Party Rally Grounds

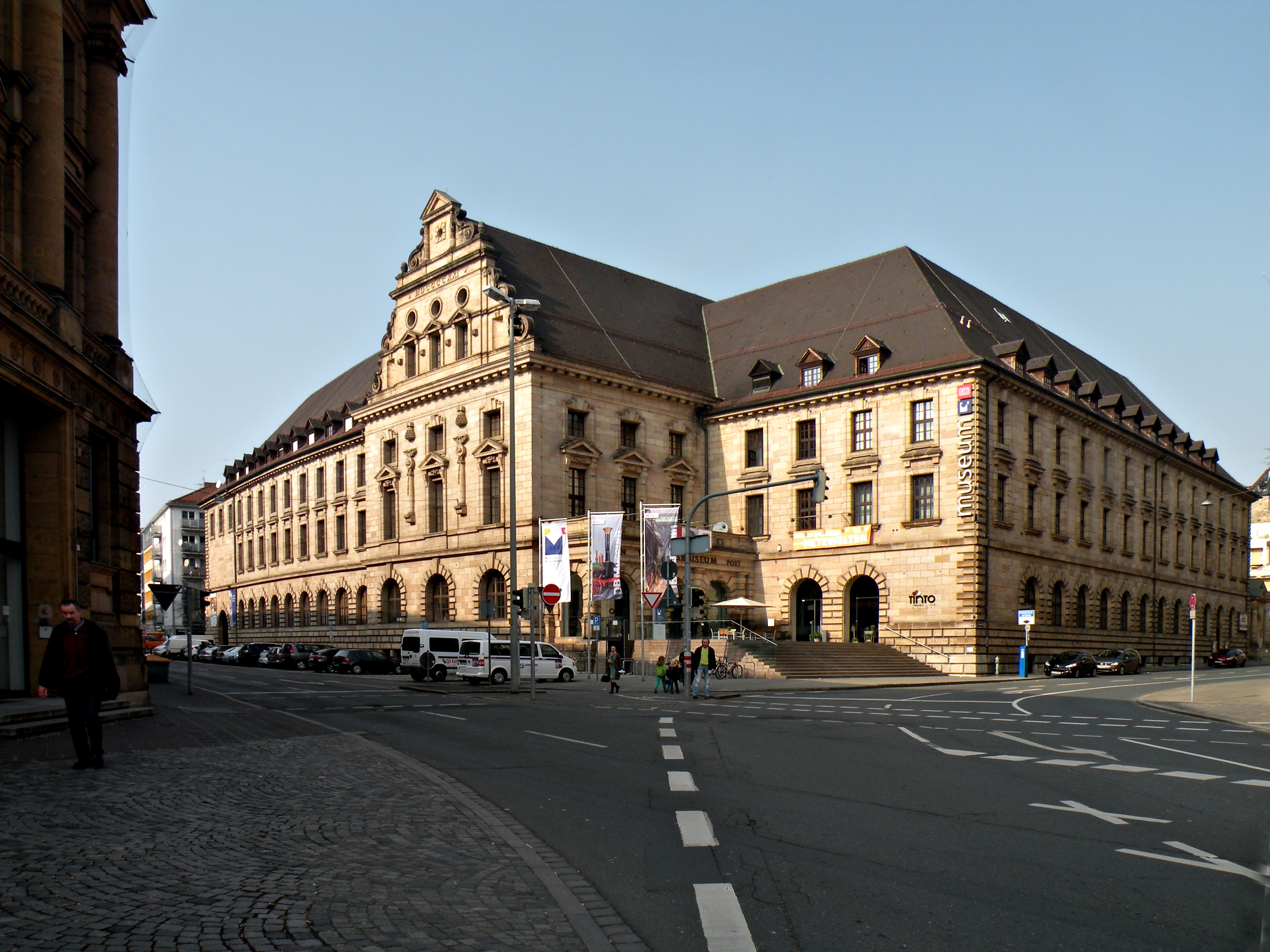
Nuremberg Transport Museum with the DB Railway Museum and the Museum of Communications

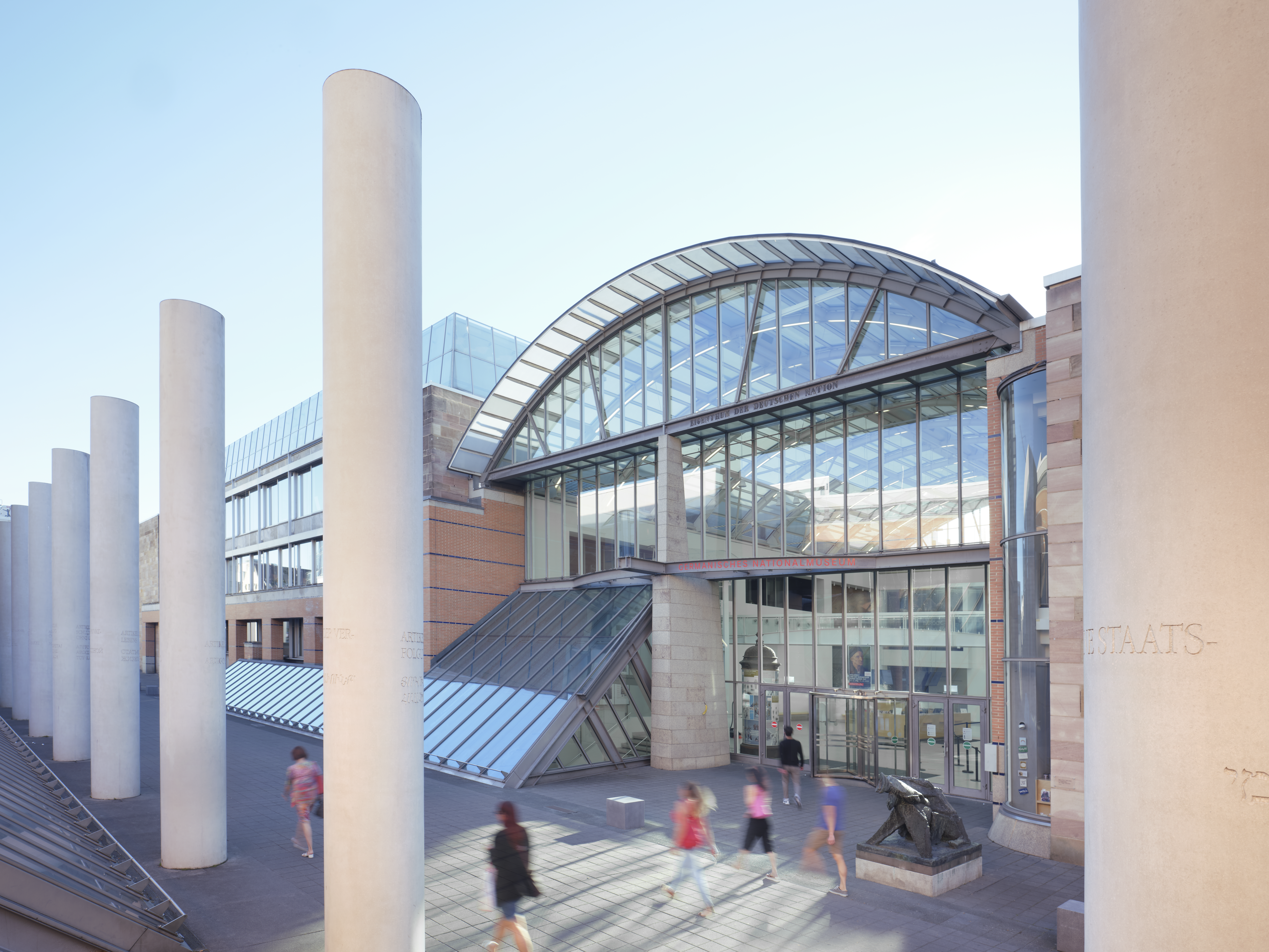
Germanisches Nationalmuseum with the Way of Human Rights

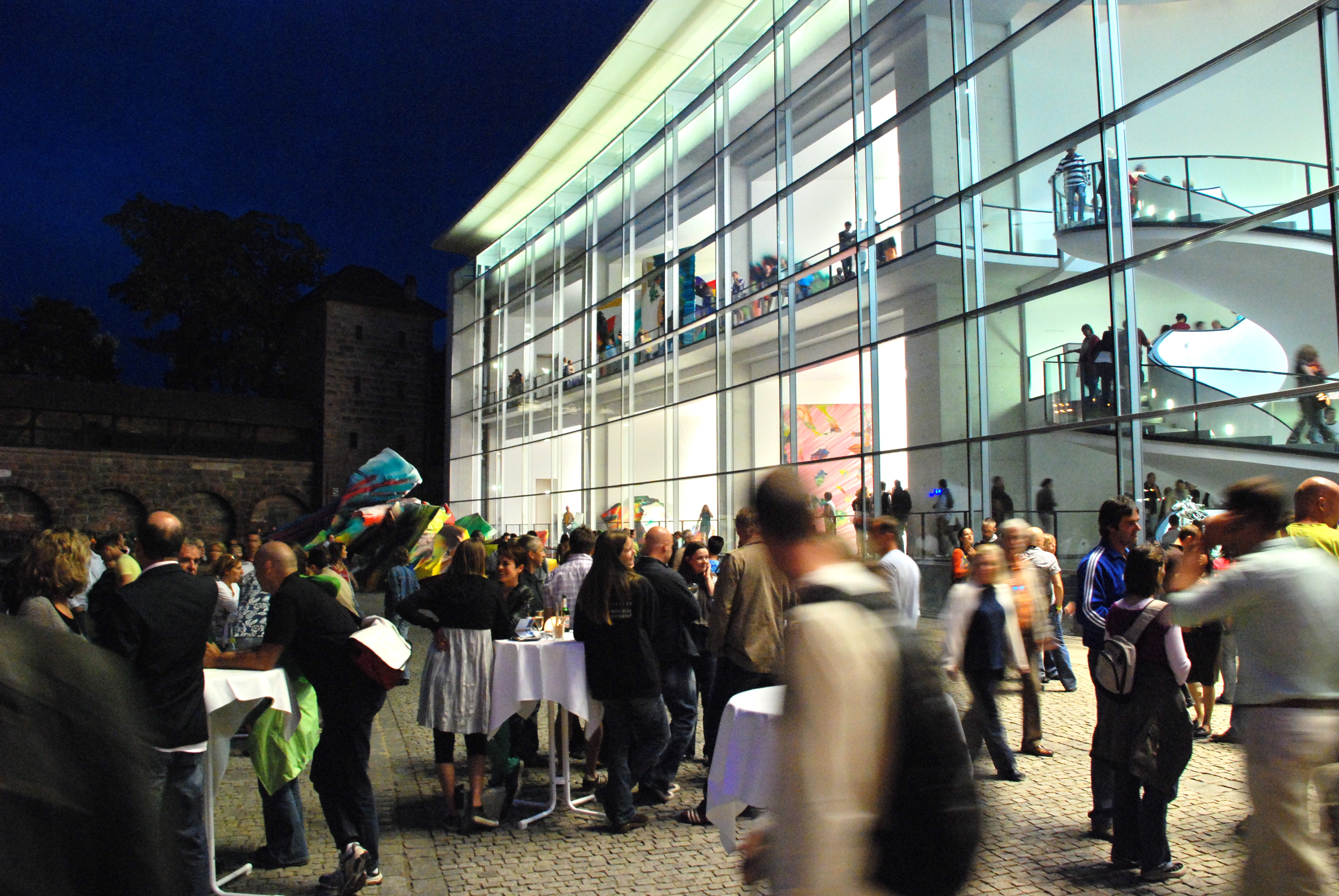
Neues Museum Nürnberg

This is a list of museums in Nuremberg, Germany:

== Active museums ==
Name	Area of Focus	Picture	Description	Opening date	Owner	Notes
Albrecht-Dürer-Haus	Art	more pictures	Albrecht Dürer's House	1828	City of Nuremberg	
Arabisches Haus Nürnberg	Culture	more pictures	The Arab House Nuremberg	2008	Private	
Bernsteinmuseum	Amber	more pictures	Amber Museum	1991	Private	
Bibelmuseum Bayern	Religious		Bible Museum of Bavaria	2022	Evangelical Lutheran Church in Bavaria	
Bionicum	Natural history	more pictures	Bionicum	2014	State of Bavaria, Nuremberg Zoo, Technische Hochschule Nürnberg, University of Erlangen–Nuremberg	
Bratwurstmuseum Nürnberg	Local history	more pictures	Nürnberger Rostbratwurst Museum	2021	Private	
Club Museum	Football	more pictures	Museum of the 1. FC Nürnberg	2013	City of Nuremberg, 1. FC Nürnberg	
DB-Museum	Transportation	more pictures	DB Railway Museum	1899	Deutsche Bahn	
Deutsches Museum Nürnberg	Technology	more pictures	Future Museum	2021	State of Bavaria	
Deutsches Spielearchiv	Games	more pictures	German Games Archive	2010	City of Nuremberg	
Deutsches Taubenmuseum	Pigeon		German Pigeon Museum	1992	Private	
Dokumentationszentrum Reichsparteitagsgelände	History	more pictures	Documentation Center Nazi Party Rally Grounds	2001	City of Nuremberg	
Feldbahn-Museum 500	Transportation	more pictures	Feldbahn Museum	unknown	Private	
Feuerwehrmuseum Nürnberg	Firefighting	more pictures	Fire Brigade Museum	2002	Private	
Fränkische Museums Eisenbahn	Transportation	more pictures	Franconian Museum Railway	1984	Private	
Friedensmuseum	Culture	more pictures	Peace Museum	1998	Private	
Garnisonmuseum Nürnberg	Military	more pictures	Military Garrison Museum Nuremberg	1992	Private	
Gemälde- und Skulpturensammlung der Stadt Nürnberg	Art		The City of Nuremberg's Painting and Sculpture Collection	1994	City of Nuremberg	
Germanisches Nationalmuseum	Art and History	more pictures	German National Museum	1853	City of Nuremberg, State of Bavaria, Federal Republic of Germany	
Graphische Sammlung der Stadt Nürnberg	Art		The City of Nuremberg's Graphics Collection	1971	City of Nuremberg	
Haus des Spiels	Amusement	more pictures	House of Games	unknown	City of Nuremberg	
Heimatmuseum Kornburg	Local history	more pictures	Local museum of Kornburg	1958	Private	
Heimatmuseum Neunhof	Local history		Local museum of Neunhof	1935	Private	
Henkerhaus Nürnberg	Local history	more pictures	Hangman's Residence Museum	2007	Private	
Historische Felsengänge	Local history	more pictures	Historic Rock-Cut Cellars	1994	Private	
Historischer Kunstbunker	Local history	more pictures	World War II Art Bunker	1994	City of Nuremberg	
Historisches Straßenbahndepot St. Peter	Transportation	more pictures	Historic tram depot St. Peter	1985	VAG Nürnberg	
Hutmuseum Nürnberg	Fashion	more pictures	Brömme Hat Museum	2003	Private	
Kaiserburgmuseum	Local history	more pictures	Nuremberg Castle Museum	1999	City of Nuremberg, State of Bavaria, Federal Republic of Germany	
Kindermuseum Nürnberg	Children's	more pictures	Children's Museum	2001	City of Nuremberg	
Krankenhausmuseum Nürnberg	Medical	more pictures	Hospital Museum Nuremberg	1997	Private	
Kunstbunker - forum für zeitgenössische Kunst	Art	more pictures	Art Bunker - forum for contemporary art	1994	Private	
Kunsthalle Nürnberg	Art	more pictures	Gallery of Contemporary Art	1967	City of Nuremberg	
Kunsthaus im KunstKulturQuartier	Art	more pictures	Art house at the art and culture area	1985	City of Nuremberg	
Kunstverein Nürnberg	Art		Art association Nuremberg	2003	Private	
Kunstvilla im KunstKulturQuartier	Art	more pictures	Art villa at the art and culture area	2014	City of Nuremberg	
Laubenmuseum	Garden House		Garden House Museum	1998	Private	
Merks Motor Museum	Transportation	more pictures	Car and motorcycle museum	2011	Private	
Mittelalterliche Lochgefägnisse Nürnberg	Local history	more pictures	Medieval Dungeons Nuremberg	1962	City of Nuremberg	
Motorradmuseum Nürnberg	Transportation	more pictures	Motorcycle museum	1988	City of Nuremberg	
Museum /22/20/18/ Kühnertsgasse	Local history	more pictures	Medieval craft museum	2011	Private	
Museum der Bayerischen Metallwarenfabrik	Industrial		Museum of the Bavarian metal goods factory	2003	Private	
Museum im Koffer	Children's	more pictures	mobile children's museum	1980	City of Nuremberg	
Museum für Kommunikation	Communication	more pictures	Museum of Communications	1902	Private	
Museum Industriekultur	Industrial	more pictures	Museum of Industrial Culture	1988	City of Nuremberg	
Museum Tuscherschloss und Hirsvogelsaal	Local history	more pictures	Museum Tucher Mansion and Hirsvogel Hall	1998	City of Nuremberg	
Naturhistorisches Museum Nürnberg	Natural history	more pictures	Natural History Museum Nuremberg	1884	Private	
Neues Museum Nürnberg	Art and Design	more pictures	Museum for Contemporary Art	2000	State of Bavaria	
Nuremberg Trials Memorial	History	more pictures	Memorium Nuremberg Trials	2010	City of Nuremberg	
Ofenwerk	Transportation	more pictures	Car and motorcycle museum	2006	Private	
Rotkreuzmuseum	Medical		Red Cross Museum Nuremberg	1984	Private	
Schlossmuseum Neunhof	Local history	more pictures	Museum Castle of Neunhof	1959	City of Nuremberg, State of Bavaria, Federal Republic of Germany	
Schulmuseum Nürnberg	Education	more pictures	School Museum Nuremberg	1906	City of Nuremberg, University of Erlangen–Nuremberg	
Silberhorn Classics	Transportation		Car and motorcycle museum	2023	Private	
Spielzeugmuseum Nürnberg	Toys	more pictures	Nuremberg Toy Museum	1971	City of Nuremberg	
Stadtmuseum Fembohaus	Local history	more pictures	City Museum at Fembo House	1953	City of Nuremberg	
Turm der Sinne	Science	more pictures	Tower of the Senses	2003	Private	
Uhrensammlung Karl Gebhardt	Clocks	more pictures	Horological Collection Karl Gebhardt	2002	Private	
Weizenglasmuseum	Design		Wheat Beer Glass Museum	1995	Private	

== Defunct museums ==
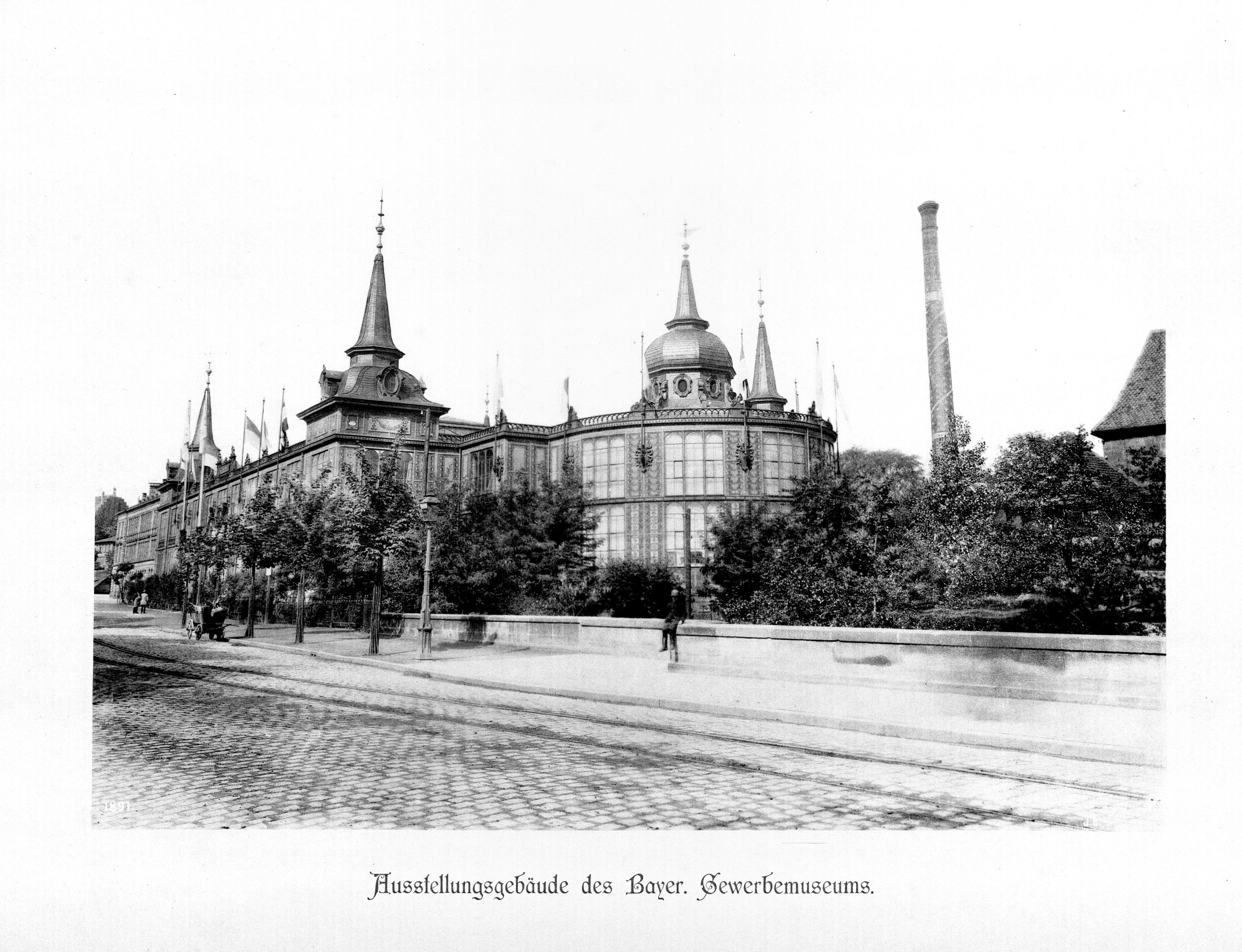
First Gewerbemuseum

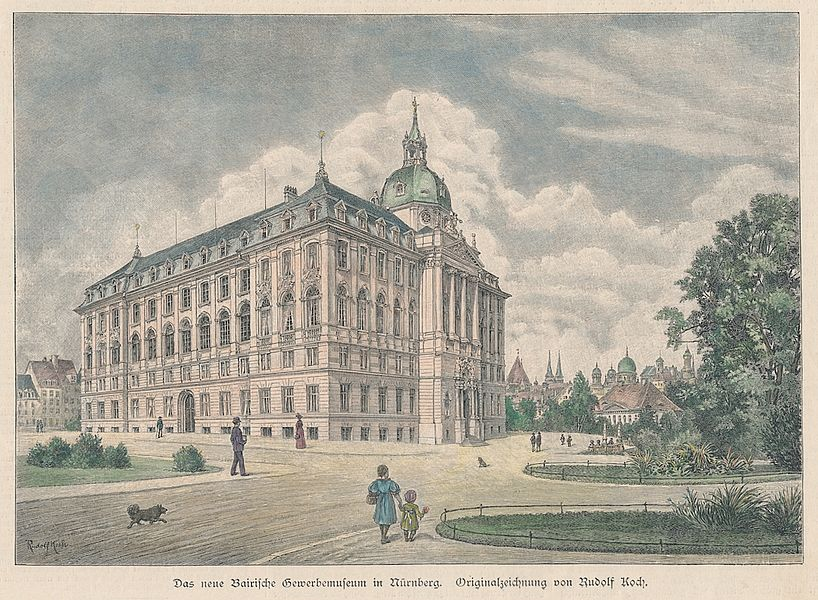
Second Gewerbemuseum

Name	Area of focus	Opening date	Close date	Notes
Deutsches Schützenmuseum	Hunting	1907	1938	
Gewerbemuseum	Multiple	1869	1945	
Norishalle	Multiple	1882	1945	
Fränkische Galerie	Art	1930	1945	
Museum für Soziale Hygiene	Medical	1930	1945	
Freilandaquarium und -Terrarium der Naturhistorischen Gesellschaft Nürnberg	Natural history	1927	unknown	
