= Ladislav Sitenský =

Czech photographer (1919–2009)

Ladislav Sitenský (7 August 1919 – 14 November 2009) was a Czech landscape photographer, well-known for his photography from World War II, when he was a technician for the Czech wing of the Royal Air Force. After 1989 he was gradually promoted to the rank of colonel. In October 2007 Sitenský was awarded the Medal of Merit in the field of culture and art by President Václav Klaus.
