= Jefferson Davis Parish, Louisiana =

Parish in Louisiana, United States

- Parish
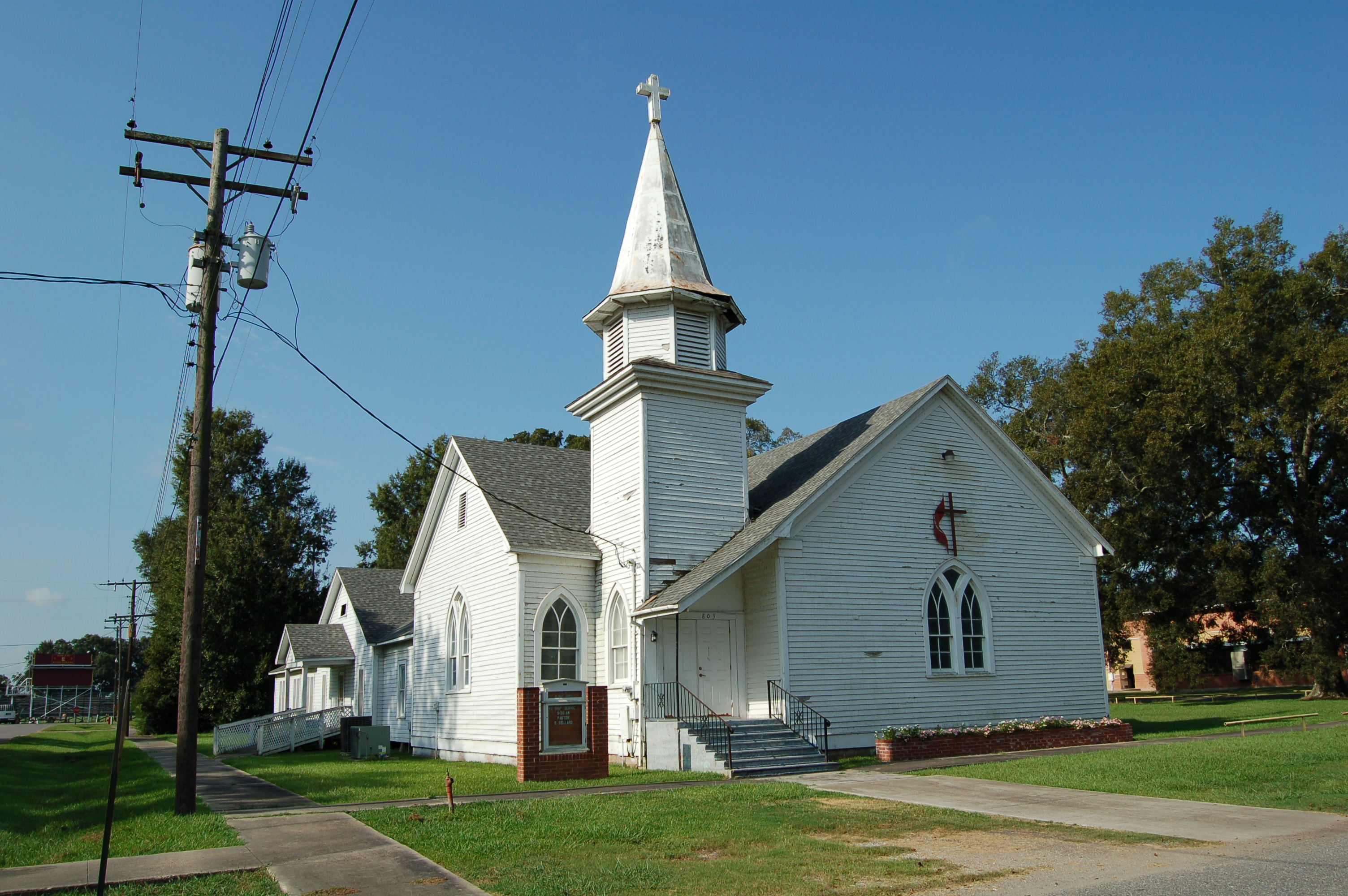
- Elton Methodist Church in Elton.

- Location within the U.S. state of Louisiana
- Coordinates: 30°14′33″N 92°40′24″W
- Country: United States
- State: Louisiana
- Founded: January 1, 1913
- Named for: Jefferson Davis
- Seat: Jennings
- Largest city: Jennings

Area
  - Total: 659 sq mi (1,710 km^{2})
  - Land: 651 sq mi (1,690 km^{2})
  - Water: 7.2 sq mi (19 km^{2}) 1.1%

Population (2020)
  - Total: 32,250
  - Estimate (2025): 31,471 ▼
  - Density: 49.5/sq mi (19.1/km^{2})
- Time zone: UTC−6 (Central)
  - Summer (DST): UTC−5 (CDT)
- Congressional district: 3rd

Jefferson Davis Parish is a parish located in the U.S. state of Louisiana. As of the 2020 census, the population was 32,250. The parish seat is Jennings. Jefferson Davis Parish is named after the president of the Confederacy during the American Civil War, Jefferson Davis. It is located in southwestern Louisiana and forms a part of the Acadiana region.

== History ==
Jefferson Davis Parish was one of the last parishes to be organized in the state of Louisiana. It was originally a part of Imperial Calcasieu Parish, which contributed to five other parishes as the population increased in the area. The bill creating Jefferson Davis Parish was passed by the state legislature in 1912 but did not take effect until 1913. Jefferson Davis Parish is part of the large, 22-parish Acadiana region of Louisiana, which is influenced by a large Francophone population. It was named after Jefferson Davis, a prominent planter and the President of the Confederate States of America.

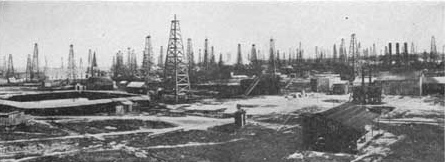
The Jennings Oil Field in 1933

The first oil in Louisiana was drilled in 1901 in Evangeline, Acadia Parish, by W. Scott Heywood, who in 1932 was elected to the Louisiana State Senate. The oil field was known as the Jennings Oil Field because Jennings was the nearest railroad stop to the oil field.

The parish was affected by Hurricane Rita in 2005, causing flooding and wind damage.

== Geography ==
According to the U.S. Census Bureau, the parish has a total area of 660 square miles (1,700 km^{2}), of which 651 square miles (1,690 km^{2}) is land and 7.2 square miles (19 km^{2}) (1.1%) is water.

Jefferson Davis Parish comprises five incorporated towns including Elton, Fenton, Jennings, Lake Arthur, and Welsh. There are also many unincorporated areas that add to the interest and economic structure of the parish including Barnsdall, Buller, China, Coverdale, Edna, Fontenot, Foreman's Hall, Hathaway, Illinois Plant, Lacassine, Lauderdale, Panchoville, Pine Island, Raymond, Roanoke, Silverwood, Thornwell, Topsy, Verret, and Woodlawn. Interstate 10 runs east and west through the center of the parish, providing access to local markets. Additionally, the Union Pacific Railroad is centrally located within the parish and the Mermentau River, which connects to the Intracoastal Waterway and has a channel depth of nine feet, provides access to the Port of Mermentau. The Jennings Airport, with a runway length of 5,000 feet (1,500 m), is capable of landing a small jet and is located next to Interstate 10. Jefferson Davis Parish also attracts sportsmen to the Lacassine National Wildlife Refuge.

=== Adjacent parishes ===
- Allen Parish (north)
- Evangeline Parish (northeast)
- Acadia Parish (east)
- Vermilion Parish (southeast)
- Cameron Parish (south)
- Calcasieu Parish (west)
- Beauregard Parish (northwest)

== Transportation ==
=== Major highways ===
- Interstate 10
- U.S. Highway 90
- U.S. Highway 165
- U.S. Highway 190
- Louisiana Highway 14
- Louisiana Highway 26
- Louisiana Highway 97
- Louisiana Highway 99
- Louisiana Highway 101
- Louisiana Highway 102
- Louisiana Highway 380
- Louisiana Highway 382
- Louisiana Highway 383
- Louisiana Highway 395
- Louisiana Highway 1126
- Louisiana Highway 1130
- Louisiana Highway 1131
- Louisiana Highway 3055
- Louisiana Highway 3056
- Louisiana Highway 3059
- Louisiana Highway 3166
- Louisiana Highway 3258

=== Airports ===
- Jennings, (3R7)
- Welsh

Jennings, USA
- IATA: none; ICAO: K3R7

Summary
- Airport type: Public
- Location: Jennings, LA
- Elevation AMSL: 23 ft (7.0 m)
- Coordinates: 30°14′33″N 92°40′24″W
- Interactive map of Jennings, USA

Runways
Direction	Length		Surface
Direction	ft	m	Surface
08/26	5,000	1,524	Asphalt
13/31	3,598	1,097	Asphalt
17/35	2,000	610	Turf

== Communities ==
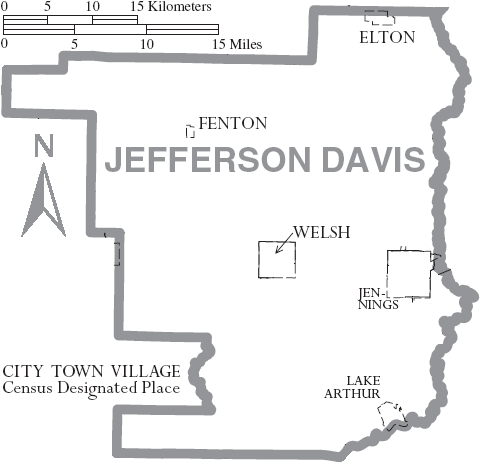
Map of Jefferson Davis Parish, with municipal labels

=== City ===
- Jennings (parish seat and largest municipality)

=== Towns ===
- Elton
- Lake Arthur
- Welsh

=== Village ===
- Fenton

=== Unincorporated areas ===
==== Census-designated places ====
- Lacassine
- Roanoke

==== Unincorporated communities ====
- Barnsdall
- Buller
- China
- Edna
- Fontenot
- Foreman's Hall
- Gravel Point
- Hathaway
- Lauderdale
- Niblett
- Panchoville
- Pine Island
- Raymond
- Silverwood
- Thornwell
- Topsy
- Verrett
- Woodlawn

== Demographics ==
Historical population
Census	Pop.	Note	%±
1920	18,999		—
1930	19,765		4.0%
1940	24,191		22.4%
1950	26,298		8.7%
1960	29,825		13.4%
1970	29,554		−0.9%
1980	32,168		8.8%
1990	30,722		−4.5%
2000	31,435		2.3%
2010	31,594		0.5%
2020	32,250		2.1%
2025 (est.)	31,471	▼	−2.4%
U.S. Decennial Census; 1790-1960 1900-1990; 1990-2000 2010

Jefferson Davis Parish, Louisiana – Racial and ethnic composition Note: the US Census treats Hispanic/Latino as an ethnic category. This table excludes Latinos from the racial categories and assigns them to a separate category. Hispanics/Latinos may be of any race.
Race / Ethnicity (NH = Non-Hispanic)	Pop 1980	Pop 1990	Pop 2000	Pop 2010	Pop 2020	% 1980	% 1990	% 2000	% 2010	% 2020
White alone (NH)	25,562	24,591	25,138	24,835	24,855	79.46%	80.04%	79.97%	78.61%	77.07%
Black or African American alone (NH)	6,061	5,809	5,571	5,450	5,130	18.84%	18.91%	17.72%	17.25%	15.91%
Native American or Alaska Native alone (NH)	34	57	113	146	147	0.11%	0.19%	0.36%	0.46%	0.46%
Asian alone (NH)	25	44	61	62	100	0.08%	0.14%	0.19%	0.20%	0.31%
Native Hawaiian or Pacific Islander alone (NH)	x	x	3	3	4	x	x	0.01%	0.01%	0.01%
Other race alone (NH)	3	20	7	28	118	0.01%	0.07%	0.02%	0.09%	0.37%
Mixed race or Multiracial (NH)	x	x	230	532	1,162	x	x	0.73%	1.68%	3.60%
Hispanic or Latino (any race)	483	201	312	538	734	1.50%	0.65%	0.99%	1.70%	2.28%
Total	32,168	30,722	31,435	31,594	32,250	100.00%	100.00%	100.00%	100.00%	100.00%

As of the 2020 United States census, there were 32,250 people, 11,726 households, and 8,149 families residing in the parish.

== Education ==
Jefferson Davis Parish Public Schools operates the schools in the parish.

- Elton Elementary School (Grades PK-5) (Elton)
- Elton High School (Grades 6–12) (Elton)
- Fenton Elementary School (Grades PK-8) (Fenton)
- Hathaway High School (Grades K-12) (Jennings)
- Jennings Elementary School (Grades 3–6) (Jennings)
- Jennings High School (Grades 7–12) (Jennings)
- Lacassine High School (Grades K-12) (Lacassine)
- Lake Arthur Elementary School (Grades PK-6) (Lake Arthur)
- Lake Arthur High School (Grades 7–12) (Lake Arthur)
- James Ward Elementary School (Grades PK-2) (Jennings)
- Welsh Elementary School (Grades PK-5) (Welsh)
- Welsh High School (Grades 8–12) (Welsh)
- Welsh-Roanoke Jr. High School (Grades 6–8) (Roanoke)

Jeff Davis Parish is served by the Roman Catholic Diocese of Lafayette which has one school in the parish:

- Our Lady Immaculate (Grades PK-8) (Jennings)

Jeff Davis Parish is served by one institution of higher education:

- It is in the service area of Sowela Technical Community College. The Morgan Smith campus is located in Jennings.

== National Guard ==
C Company 3-156TH Infantry Battalion resides in Jennings, Louisiana. This unit as part of the 256th IBCT deployed twice to Iraq in 2004—5 and 2010.

== Notable people ==
- A.C. Clemons (1921–1992), former Louisiana state senator from 1960 to 1972
- Al Woods (born 1987), former American football player of the NFL
- Thomas A. "Tom" Greene (born 1948), former Louisiana state senator from 1992 to 2000
- Travis Etienne (born 1999), current American football player for the New Orleans Saints of the NFL
- Trevor Etienne (born 2004), current American football player for the Carolina Panthers of the NFL
- Cleve Francis (born 1945), country music singer, songwriter, and cardiologist
- Monte Ledbetter (born 1943), former American football player in the NFL
- Eugene John Hebert (1923–1990), priest and Jesuit missionary who famously disappeared in Sri Lanka in 1990 during the Sri Lankan civil war
- Canray Fontenot (1922–1995), American Creole musician
- Lance Guidry (born 1971), American football coach
- Charles Mann (born 1944), singer and swamp pop performer and member of the Louisiana Music Hall of Fame
- Jack Doland (1928–1991), former Louisiana state senator and head football coach, athletic director, and president of McNeese State University
- Chancy Croft (1937–2022), former Democratic politician from Alaska
- Avalon Daggett (1907–2002), filmmaker and philanthropist
- June James (1962–1990), former American football player in the NFL and CFL
- Pat Rapp (born 1967), former professional baseball player
- Guy Sockrider (1921–2011), former Louisiana state senator
- Donald Ellsworth Walter (born 1936), former United States district judge of the United States District Court for the Western District of Louisiana
- Phillip Walker (1937–2010), musician
- Troy Romero, former Louisiana State Representative from the 37th district

== Politics ==
United States presidential election results for Jefferson Davis Parish, Louisiana
Year	Republican		Democratic		Third party(ies)	
Year	No.	%	No.	%	No.	%
1916	200	22.91%	656	75.14%	17	1.95%
1920	895	55.14%	728	44.86%	0	0.00%
1924	883	47.58%	973	52.42%	0	0.00%
1928	1,120	39.67%	1,703	60.33%	0	0.00%
1932	512	18.13%	2,308	81.73%	4	0.14%
1936	608	19.15%	2,567	80.85%	0	0.00%
1940	1,054	29.40%	2,531	70.60%	0	0.00%
1944	1,156	33.17%	2,329	66.83%	0	0.00%
1948	793	21.78%	1,717	47.16%	1,131	31.06%
1952	3,447	49.03%	3,584	50.97%	0	0.00%
1956	4,170	62.93%	2,346	35.41%	110	1.66%
1960	2,251	25.84%	5,904	67.77%	557	6.39%
1964	3,673	42.52%	4,966	57.48%	0	0.00%
1968	2,213	22.70%	2,641	27.08%	4,897	50.22%
1972	5,903	65.96%	2,551	28.51%	495	5.53%
1976	3,603	35.06%	6,376	62.04%	299	2.91%
1980	5,667	46.73%	6,140	50.63%	320	2.64%
1984	8,296	57.36%	5,962	41.22%	206	1.42%
1988	5,851	45.74%	6,799	53.15%	141	1.10%
1992	4,513	32.61%	7,022	50.74%	2,303	16.64%
1996	4,311	33.31%	6,897	53.29%	1,735	13.40%
2000	6,945	55.36%	5,162	41.14%	439	3.50%
2004	8,055	61.93%	4,745	36.48%	207	1.59%
2008	9,278	68.72%	3,923	29.06%	300	2.22%
2012	10,014	72.91%	3,484	25.37%	236	1.72%
2016	10,775	75.47%	3,080	21.57%	422	2.96%
2020	11,423	76.97%	3,208	21.62%	210	1.41%
2024	11,478	79.94%	2,699	18.80%	181	1.26%

For most of the 20th Century, Jeff Davis was a Democratic-leaning parish, voting Republican only in landslide elections such as 1972 and 1984. However, like other Acadian parishes with large Cajun populations, Jeff Davis turned sharply right in the 21st century based on cultural issues and Democrats' discomfort with the oil and gas industry.

== See also ==
- Jeff Davis 8 string of unsolved murders
- National Register of Historic Places listings in Jefferson Davis Parish, Louisiana
