= Bearcat =

The bearcat, also known as the binturong, is a viverrine mammal from Southeast Asia.

Bearcat or bearkat may also refer to:

== Entertainment ==
- Bearcats!, a 1971 American TV series
- The Bearcat, a 1922 film starring Hoot Gibson
- "Do the Bearcat", a popular Canadian blues song written and performed by David Wilcox
- Bearcat Wright, a professional wrestler popular in the late 1950s and 1960s
- Keith Lee (wrestler), professional wrestler known as Bearcat Lee
- Bearcat (album), by Clifford Jordan

== Locations ==
- Bearcat Base, a former U.S. Army base near the city of Biên Hòa in Đồng Nai Province in southern Vietnam

== Technology ==
- AeroLites Bearcat, an American homebuilt aircraft design
- BearCat, a line of radio scanners produced by Uniden
- Grumman F8F Bearcat, a Grumman-built fighter aircraft used by the U.S. Navy
- Lenco BearCat, an armored personnel carrier
- Ruger Bearcat, a single-action .22 LR revolver
- Stutz Bearcat, an automobile produced by the Stutz Motor Company

== Sports teams ==
- Baruch Bearcats, at Baruch College
- Binghamton Bearcats, at Binghamton University
- Brescia Bearcats, at Brescia University
- Cincinnati Bearcats, at University of Cincinnati
- Northwest Missouri State Bearcats, at Northwest Missouri State University
- Sam Houston State Bearkats, at Sam Houston State University
- Southwest Baptist Bearcats, at Southwest Baptist University
- Truro Bearcats, Truro, Nova Scotia
- Willamette Bearcats, at Willamette University

== See also ==
- Binturong, a viverrid also known as "bearcat"
- Giant panda, also known as "bear cat" or "cat bear"
- Red panda, also known as "cat-bear"
- Ailurarctos, known as "cat bear" in English
