= Hathaway High School =

Location
- 4040 Pine Island Highway; Hathaway, Louisiana; Hathaway, (Jefferson Davis Parish), Louisiana 70546; United States; 30.3506°N 92.6724°W

Information
- School type: Public High school
- Motto: Learners Today, Leaders tomorrow
- School district: Jefferson Davis Parish School Board
- Principal: Cassidy Juneau
- Staff: 38.51 (FTE)
- Grades: K-12
- Enrollment: 609 (2023-24)
- Student to teacher ratio: 15.81
- Colors: Blue and gold
- Mascot: Hornets
- Website: www.jeffersondavis.org/hathawayhighschool

Hathaway High School (HHS) is a K-12 school in Hathaway, unincorporated Jeff Davis Parish, Louisiana. It is a part of Jefferson Davis Parish Public Schools. The current building is 60,000-square-foot (5,600 m^{2}) large.

As of 2016, the school had 780 students.

== History ==
It opened in 1920 in a wooden building on a site that had been acquired from George Hathaway and W. Claude Lamb; it was formed by a merger of the Crochet, Glen Roy, Grand Marais, Nubbin Ridge, and Raymond elementary schools. In 1938-1939 a new steel school building opened, and high school grades opened, with the first graduating class in 1941. A new cafeteria opened in 1945. The school received the twelfth grade in the 1948–1949 school year. A renovation occurred in 1953. In 1975 kindergarten grades opened as they became required under state law. Six more classrooms were installed in 1983. A fire on Sunday, November 26, 1989, destroyed much of the school building, so students temporarily had to attend classes in Lake Arthur while a replacement school building financed by an October 1989 bond was underway. The current building opened in Fall 1992.

== Athletics ==
Hathaway High athletics competes in the LHSAA.

=== State championships ===
Girls basketball

- 2023
