= Elton, Louisiana =

- Town
- Location of Elton in Jefferson Davis Parish, Louisiana

- Location of Louisiana in the United States
- Coordinates: 30°28′51″N 92°41′47″W
- Country: United States
- State: Louisiana
- Parish: Jefferson Davis

Government
  - Mayor: Mike Pierrotti (R)

Area
  - Total: 1.66 sq mi (4.30 km^{2})
  - Land: 1.66 sq mi (4.30 km^{2})
  - Water: 0 sq mi (0.00 km^{2})
- Elevation: 49 ft (15 m)

Population (2020)
  - Total: 992
  - Density: 597/sq mi (230.6/km^{2})
- Time zone: UTC-6 (CST)
  - Summer (DST): UTC-5 (CDT)
- ZIP code: 70532
- Area code: 337
- FIPS code: 22-23620
- Website: townofelton.municipalimpact.com

Elton is a town in Jefferson Davis Parish, Louisiana, United States. The population was 992 at the 2020 census, down from 1,128 at the 2010 census. It is part of the Jennings Micropolitan Statistical Area.

== History ==
The wife of pioneer settler J. M. Henderson is said to have chosen the name "Elton" for her home town from a book in which she read of an English town named Elton. That was probably the town on the northeast coast of England in County Durham near Middlesbrough. Elton, Louisiana, was incorporated as a village in 1911.

== Geography ==
Elton is in northeast Jefferson Davis Parish and is bordered to the north by Allen Parish. U.S. Route 190 passes through the town, leading east 16 miles (26 km) to Eunice and west 9 miles (14 km) to Kinder. Jennings, the Jefferson Davis Parish seat, is 26 miles (42 km) to the south of Elton via Louisiana Highway 26.

According to the United States Census Bureau, the town of Elton has a total area of 1.7 square miles (4.3 km^{2}), all land.

== Demographics ==
Historical population
Census	Pop.	Note	%±
1920	995		—
1930	742		−25.4%
1940	901		21.4%
1950	1,434		59.2%
1960	1,595		11.2%
1970	1,598		0.2%
1980	1,450		−9.3%
1990	1,277		−11.9%
2000	1,261		−1.3%
2010	1,128		−10.5%
2020	992		−12.1%
2025 (est.)	974	▼	−1.8%
U.S. Decennial Census

Elton racial composition as of 2020
Race	Number	Percentage
White (non-Hispanic)	493	49.7%
Black or African American (non-Hispanic)	369	37.2%
Native American	32	3.23%
Asian	6	0.6%
Other/Mixed	66	6.65%
Hispanic or Latino	26	2.62%

As of the 2020 United States census, there were 992 people, 504 households, and 291 families residing in the town.

== Education ==
Jefferson Davis Parish Public Schools operates public schools in Elton. Schools serving Elton, within Elton, include Elton Elementary School (PK-5) and Elton High School (6-12).

Jefferson Davis Parish Library operates the Elton Branch at 813 Main Street.

== Notable people ==
- Al Woods- former American football player in the NFL
