= Fenton, Louisiana =

- Village
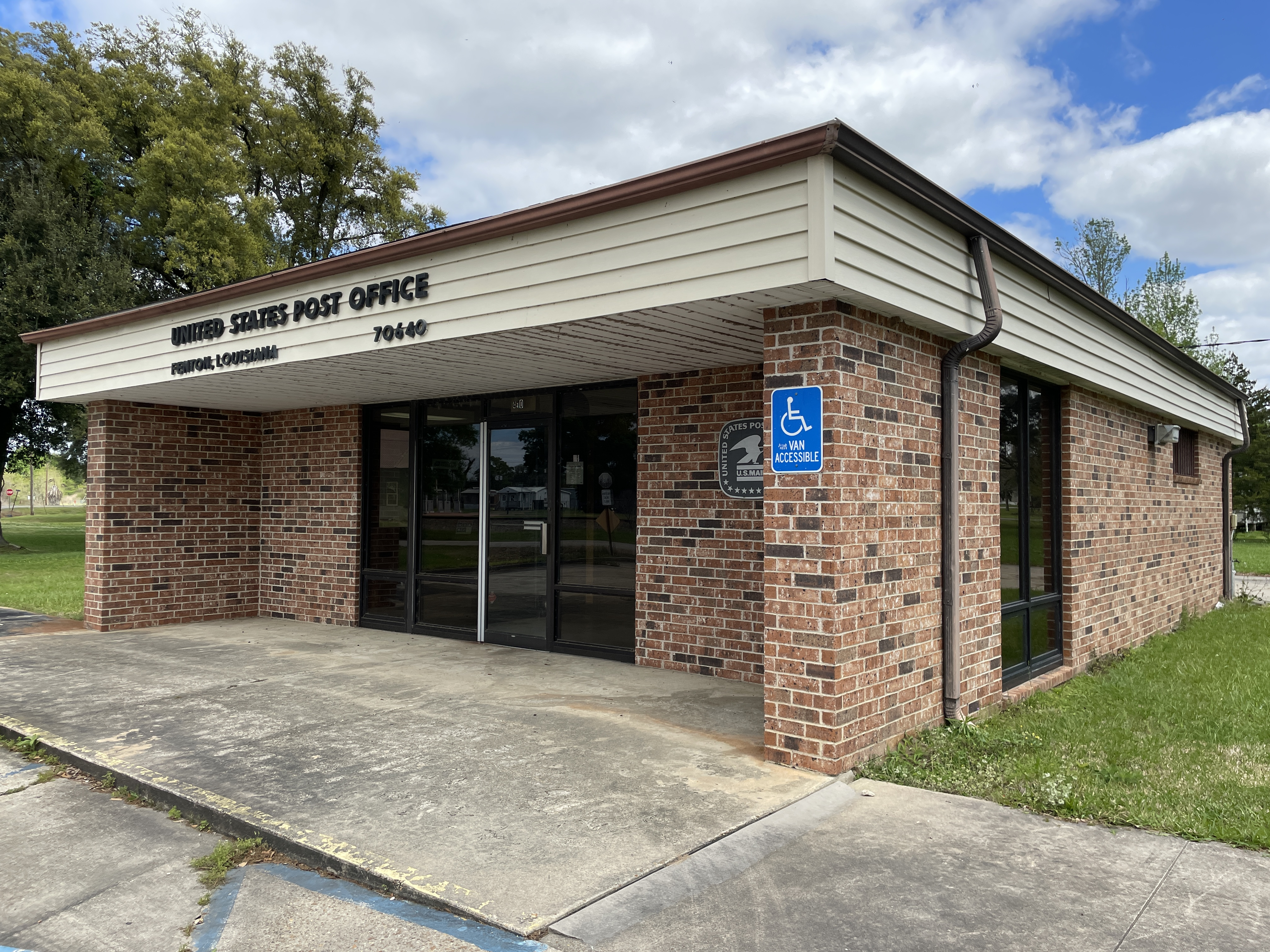
- Fenton Post Office

- Location within Jefferson Davis Parish and Louisiana

- Location of Louisiana in the United States
- Coordinates: 30°21′51″N 92°55′03″W
- Country: United States
- State: Louisiana
- Parish: Jefferson Davis

Government

Area
  - Total: 0.49 sq mi (1.26 km^{2})
  - Land: 0.49 sq mi (1.26 km^{2})
  - Water: 0 sq mi (0.00 km^{2})
- Elevation: 33 ft (10 m)

Population (2020)
  - Total: 226
  - Density: 466.4/sq mi (180.06/km^{2})
- Time zone: UTC-6 (CST)
  - Summer (DST): UTC-5 (CDT)
- Area code: 337
- FIPS code: 22-25335
- Website: villageoffenton.net

Fenton is a village in Jefferson Davis Parish, Louisiana, United States. The population was 226 at the 2020 census. It is notable for being a speed trap along U.S. Route 165.

== History ==
Fenton has received notoriety because of the village's use of the police department to write speeding tickets. Fines and forfeitures account for funding 92% of the village's budget, the highest rate in Louisiana.

== Geography ==
Fenton is located in northwestern Jefferson Davis Parish at 30°21′51″N 92°55′3″W (30.364271, -92.917514). U.S. Route 165 passes through the center of town, leading northeast 9 miles (14 km) to Kinder and southwest 11 miles (18 km) to Iowa.

According to the United States Census Bureau, Fenton has a total area of 0.42 square miles (1.1 km^{2}), all land.

== Demographics ==
Historical population
Census	Pop.	Note	%±
1960	429		—
1970	404		−5.8%
1980	491		21.5%
1990	265		−46.0%
2000	380		43.4%
2010	379		−0.3%
2020	226		−40.4%
2025 (est.)	217	▼	−4.0%
U.S. Decennial Census

Fenton is part of the Jennings Micropolitan Statistical Area.

=== 2020 census ===
Fenton village, Louisiana – Racial and ethnic composition Note: the US Census treats Hispanic/Latino as an ethnic category. This table excludes Latinos from the racial categories and assigns them to a separate category. Hispanics/Latinos may be of any race.
Race / Ethnicity (NH = Non-Hispanic)	Pop 2000	Pop 2010	Pop 2020	% 2000	% 2010	% 2020
White alone (NH)	171	138	101	45.00%	36.41%	44.69%
Black or African American alone (NH)	197	211	104	51.84%	55.67%	46.02%
Native American or Alaska Native alone (NH)	1	2	0	0.26%	0.53%	0.00%
Asian alone (NH)	1	0	0	0.26%	0.00%	0.00%
Pacific Islander alone (NH)	0	0	0	0.00%	0.00%	0.00%
Other Race alone (NH)	0	0	2	0.00%	0.00%	0.88%
Mixed race or Multiracial (NH)	2	15	13	0.53%	3.96%	5.75%
Hispanic or Latino (any race)	8	13	6	2.11%	3.43%	2.65%
Total	380	379	223	100.00%	100.00%	100.00%

As of the census of 2000, there were 380 people, 141 households, and 101 families residing in the village. The population density was 921.6 inhabitants per square mile (355.8/km^{2}). There were 153 housing units at an average density of 371.1 per square mile (143.3/km^{2}). The racial makeup of the village was 45.26% White, 52.37% African American, 0.26% Native American, 0.26% Asian, 0.53% from other races, and 1.32% from two or more races. Hispanic or Latino of any race were 2.11% of the population.

There were 141 households, out of which 41.1% had children under the age of 18 living with them, 48.9% were married couples living together, 17.7% had a female householder with no husband present, and 27.7% were non-families. 26.2% of all households were made up of individuals, and 14.2% had someone living alone who was 65 years of age or older. The average household size was 2.69 and the average family size was 3.23.

In the village, the population was spread out, with 32.9% under the age of 18, 10.3% from 18 to 24, 25.0% from 25 to 44, 21.3% from 45 to 64, and 10.5% who were 65 years of age or older. The median age was 31 years. For every 100 females, there were 94.9 males. For every 100 females age 18 and over, there were 83.5 males.

The median income for a household in the village was $21,125, and the median income for a family was $25,625. Males had a median income of $25,417 versus $21,250 for females. The per capita income for the village was $9,958. About 29.1% of families and 33.3% of the population were below the poverty line, including 45.1% of those under age 18 and 19.4% of those age 65 or over.

== Education ==
The entire parish is in the Jefferson Davis Parish School District.

== Notable persons ==
Thomas A. "Tom" Greene, a former state senator from Iberville Parish, graduated in 1966 from Fenton High School.
