= Senator Knowles =

Senator Knowles may refer to:

- Jesse Monroe Knowles (1919–2006), Louisiana State Senate
- Robert P. Knowles (1916–1985), Wisconsin State Senate
- Warren P. Knowles (1908–1993), Wisconsin State Senate
