= AeroLites AeroMaster AG =

American homebuilt aircraft

AeroMaster AG

General information
- Type: Homebuilt aircraft
- National origin: United States
- Manufacturer: AeroLites Inc
- Status: In production (2013)
- Number built: 22 (2003)

History
- First flight: 1993

The AeroLites AeroMaster AG is an American homebuilt agricultural aircraft, designed and produced by AeroLites of Welsh, Louisiana. The aircraft is supplied as a kit for amateur construction.

== Design and development ==
The AeroMaster AG features a strut-braced mid-wing, a single-seat open cockpit with a windshield, fixed conventional landing gear and a single engine in tractor configuration.

The aircraft fuselage is made from welded 4130 steel tubing, while the wing is bolted-together aluminum, with its flying surfaces covered in Dacron sailcloth envelopes. Its 28.70 ft (8.7 m) span wing has a wing area of 146 sq ft (13.6 m^{2}). The recommended power range is 50 to 80 hp (37 to 60 kW) and the standard engine used is the 64 hp (48 kW) Rotax 582 powerplant.

The aerial application system is a SprayMiser CDA Ag system with a 30 U.S. gallons (110 L; 25 imp gal) chemical tank.

The aircraft has an empty weight of 450 lb (200 kg) and a gross weight of 975 lb (442 kg), giving a useful load of 525 lb (238 kg). With full fuel of 10 U.S. gallons (38 L; 8.3 imp gal) the payload is 465 lb (211 kg).

The manufacturer estimates the construction time from the supplied kit as 170 hours.

== Operational history ==
By 1998 the company reported that six kits had been sold and four aircraft were flying.

In November 2013 three examples were registered in the United States with the Federal Aviation Administration.

== Specifications (AeroMaster AG) ==
Data from AeroCrafter

General characteristics

- Crew: one
- Length: 17 ft 6 in (5.33 m)
- Wingspan: 28.70 ft (8.75 m)
- Empty weight: 450 lb (204 kg)
- Gross weight: 975 lb (442 kg)
- Fuel capacity: 10 U.S. gallons (38 L; 8.3 imp gal)
- Powerplant: 1 × Rotax 582 twin cylinder, liquid-cooled, two stroke aircraft engine, 64 hp (48 kW)
- Propellers: 3-bladed composite

Performance

- Maximum speed: 95 mph (153 km/h, 83 kn)
- Cruise speed: 80 mph (130 km/h, 70 kn)
- Stall speed: 23 mph (37 km/h, 20 kn)
- Range: 140 mi (230 km, 120 nmi)
- Service ceiling: 10,000 ft (3,000 m)
- Rate of climb: 1,300 ft/min (6.6 m/s)
- Wing loading: 6.68 lb/sq ft (32.6 kg/m^{2})
