= Cleve Francis =

American singer-songwriter (born 1945)

- Born: Cleveland Francis Jr. April 22, 1945 (age 81)
- Origin: Jennings, Louisiana, U.S.
- Genres: Country; folk
- Occupations: Singer-songwriter, cardiologist
- Instruments: Vocals, guitar
- Years active: 1970–present
- Labels: Playback, Liberty, Forager, Cleve Francis Productions
- Website: http://www.clevefrancis.com

Cleveland Francis Jr. (born April 22, 1945) is an American country music singer, songwriter, and cardiologist based in Washington, D.C. Active since the late 1960s, Francis has recorded a total of ten albums, including three for Liberty Records. He has charted four times on Billboard Hot Country Songs, most successfully with "You Do My Heart Good" in 1992.

== Early life ==
Cleve Francis was born in Jennings, Louisiana, in Jefferson Davis Parish, a region of Southwest Louisiana known for its diverse musical traditions, including gospel, blues, jazz, country, and zydeco. He grew up in a racially segregated community, where railroad tracks marked divisions between Black and white residents. Schools for Black students were under-resourced and often relied on hand-me-down textbooks with missing pages and prior annotations. His mother, Mary, worked as a maid and walked seven miles to her job, while his stepfather worked as a day laborer.

From an early age, Francis was exposed to a wide range of musical influences. He listened to artists such as Sam Cooke, Otis Redding, Nat King Cole, Elvis Presley, Mahalia Jackson, and James Brown. The musical culture of his community, where many residents played instruments or sang, also contributed to his early interest in music.

Because his family could not initially afford an instrument, Francis built a makeshift guitar using a cigar box, wire, and wood, teaching himself how to play. His mother saved spare coins over a year to purchase a $25 six-string Silvertone guitar from Sears & Roebuck. At age nine, he began writing and performing songs, with his earliest public performances taking place at his local Baptist church.

During his school years, he remained active in both academics and music. He played tuba in his high school band, served as student choral director, and performed with a gospel group known as the Mid South Spiritual Singers at churches and revivals throughout rural Louisiana. He was also involved in student leadership and academic activities, graduating as salutatorian of Jefferson Davis High School in 1963.

== Education and Medical Career ==
Francis attended Southern University, a historically black college in Baton Rouge, and he was the first in his family to receive a formal education. While he was at Southern, he met a Black doctor for the first time, an experience that led him to switch his academic focus to pre-med studies.

Due to limited medical school acceptance from historically Black institutions at the time, Francis decided to continue his education at the College of William & Mary, where he earned a Master of Arts degree in biology.

He was then admitted to the Medical College of Virginia (now Virginia Commonwealth University School of Medicine), where he was one of two Black students in his freshman class. During medical school, Francis remained active in music, performing folk and blues songs and participating in informal jam sessions with fellow students in the lobby of the nursing dormitory on Friday nights. During academic breaks, he returned to the Tidewater area to perform with local folk groups. Loans and scholarships helped support his medical education, while income from musical performances contributed to his living expenses, including books, clothing, and food.

Initially interested in fields such as psychiatry and obstetrics, Francis later chose to specialize in cardiology after witnessing a medical emergency during his training in which cardiologists brought order to a chaotic situation and stabilized a patient. He has cited this experience as influential in shaping his interest in the field.

He completed a residency in internal medicine and a cardiology fellowship at George Washington University Hospital in Washington, D.C. Francis then founded Mount Vernon Cardiology Associates in Northern Virginia, which grew to become one of the largest cardiology practices in the region. He was practicing there when his music began to attract wider attention, leading to opportunities that would mark his transition into a professional recording career.

== Early Music Career ==
While earning his Master of Arts at William & Mary in the late 1960s, Cleve quickly found an audience that enjoyed his music as he began playing at local coffee shops in Virginia. Francis debuted his album Follow Me in 1970. In 1968 he recorded his first album and it was officially published in 1970. The album was a hit with songs like "Hot Sun" and covers, focused on folk and blues music. This time period was a tricky one for Francis as he established his cardiology practice in the 70s and 80s. Despite this, he continued playing music and shifted his focus to country Music in the late 1980s.

== Country Music Career (1980's-present) ==
Although Francis started his academic career at Southern University in Baton Rouge, LA, his music career did not begin until the late 1960s as a folk and blues singer and songwriter while still a graduate student at the College of William & Mary. After attending medical school at the Medical College of Virginia, he eventually becoming a cardiologist. However, in the late 1980s, he switched his focus to country music, signing first to Playback Records, thanks to a patient who helped him get an audition. His debut country album Last Call for Love was released that year. The album included a single titled "Love Light", which was also made into a music video.

After seeing the attention that Cleve Francis got from his first album, along with the video for "Love Light" on CMT, record producer Jimmy Bowen signed Francis to Liberty Records (now Capitol Records Nashville) in 1992. Fracis was one of a few Black artists to have a significant recording contract since Charley Pride. Between 1992 and 1994, Francis released three studio albums on Liberty, in addition to charting four singles on the Billboard Hot Country Singles & Tracks (now Hot Country Songs) charts. One of these was his album, "Tourist in Paradise" in the spring of 1992. In 1994, Francis returned to his medical practice in Northern Virginia. He is president of Mount Vernon Cardiology Associates. Francis has performed at The Birchmere in Alexandria, Virginia, and has a live album recorded there in 2006 called Storytime. In 2022, Francis released "Beyond the Willow Tree" on Forager Records, a remastered reissue of his 1970 self-released folk album, "Follow Me," which includes several other folk songs Francis had recorded as demos in 1968 and 1970. By 1995, Francis left the music industry for some time to focus on his career in cardiology until his return with his album Meet Cleve Francis under a new label, K-Tel in 2007. Francis has gone on to release four more albums since Meet Cleve Francis, including Storytime in 2007 under his own label "Cleve Francis Productions", Lovelight in 2021 under the label K-Tel, Beyond the Willow Tree in 2022 under Forager Records, and finally Traveling Man in 2024. In recent years, Francis has been awarded a few honors for his contributions to country music.

Cleve Francis has been recognized by country artist Jimmie Allen. Jimmie Allen named him as one of his "inspirations". In 2022, Francis began working at the INOVA Schar Cancer Institute where he runs a committee that is based on equality, mentoring, and education. In particular, Francis works with the Dream B!G program where he mentors children and exposes them to a life in the health profession. Francis is now retired and lives in Alexandria, Virginia with his wife.

== Later musical work and revival (2006-present) ==
Though his prime was in the late 1960-80s, Cleve Francis never stopped producing music. He has a live album from 2006 called Storytime which was recorded at the Birchmere in Alexandria, Virginia. In 2021, Francis dropped an album called Lovelight which stars songs like "Cry Baby" and "Endlessly". In 2022, Cleve Francis released an album called Beyond the Willow Tree, which was essentially a new version of his first folk album Follow Me. Along with songs from Follow Me, previously recorded folk songs were added to the album.

Francis' last released song was "Travelin' Man" which was released in 2024 as a single.

== Recognition ==
Cleve Francis spoke at the Opening Convocation at the College of William & Mary in 2024. Francis has additionally been recognized in the National Museum of African American History and Culture in Washington, with one of his country albums, "Walkin'", being on display. Francis was also featured in 2023 in the Country Music Hall of Fame. He was also honored in 2021 with the Black Opry Icon Award. In 1992, Charley Pride and Cleve Francis were the only two Black artists to receive recognition in Nashville.

== Discography ==
=== Albums ===
| Title | Album details | Peak chart positions | |
| Title | Album details | US Country | US Heat |
|---|---|---|---|
| Follow Me | Release date: 1970; Label: Self-released | — | — |
| Last Call for Love | Release date: 1990; Label: Playback | — | — |
| Tourist in Paradise | Release date: March 16, 1992; Label: Liberty | 58 | 34 |
| Walkin' | Release date: May 10, 1993; Label: Capitol Records Nashville | — | — |
| You've Got Me Now | Release date: August 23, 1994; Label: Capitol Records Nashville | — | — |
| Meet Cleve Francis | Release date: April 12, 2007; Label: K-Tel | — | — |
| Storytime | Release date: January 12, 2007; Label: Cleve Francis Productions | — | — |
| Lovelight | Release date: March 10, 2021; Label: K-Tel | — | — |
| Beyond the Willow Tree | Release date: June 15, 2022; Label: Forager Records | — | — |
| Traveling Man | Release date: September 3, 2024; Label: K-Tel | | |
"—" denotes releases that did not chart

=== Singles ===
| Year | Single | Peak chart positions | | Album |
| Year | Single | US Country | CAN Country | Album |
|---|---|---|---|---|
| 1990 | "Love Light" | — | — | Last Call for Love |
| 1992 | "Love Light" (re-release) | 52 | — | Tourist in Paradise |
| 1992 | "You Do My Heart Good" | 47 | 76 | Tourist in Paradise |
| 1992 | "How Can I Hold You" | 74 | — | Tourist in Paradise |
| 1993 | "Walkin'" | 63 | — | Walkin' |
| 1993 | "I Won't Let You Walk Away" | — | — | Walkin' |
| 1994 | "Love or the Lack Thereof" | — | — | You've Got Me Now |
| 1994 | "We Fell in Love Anyway" (with Patti Austin) | — | — | You've Got Me Now |
"—" denotes releases that did not chart

=== Music videos ===
| Year | Video | Director |
|---|---|---|
| 1990 | "Love Light" | D.J. Schweitzer |
| 1992 | "You Do My Heart Good" | Bill Young |
| 1993 | "Walkin'" | Sara Nichols |
| 1993 | "I Won't Let You Walk Away" | Joanne Gardner |
| 1994 | "Love or the Lack Thereof" | L. J. Kreussling |
| 1994 | "We Fell in Love Anyway" (with Patti Austin) | Dominic Orlando |
