= Welsh High School =

Location
- 306 East Bourgeois Street; Welsh, (Jefferson Davis Parish), Louisiana 70591; United States; 30.2352°N 92.8114°W

Information
- Type: Public high school
- School district: Jefferson Davis Parish School Board
- Principal: Brant Smith
- Staff: 21.70 (FTE)
- Grades: 9-12
- Enrollment: 274 (2023-2024)
- Student to teacher ratio: 12.63
- Colors: Red and black
- Mascot: Greyhound
- Nickname: Greyhounds
- Website: www.jeffersondavis.org/welshhighschool

Welsh High School (WHS) is a grade 9-12 senior high school in Welsh, Louisiana, United States. It is a part of Jeff Davis Parish Public Schools.

As of 2011 it had 283 students.

== Athletics ==
Welsh High athletics competes in the LHSAA.

=== State Championships ===
Football

- (1) 2017

=== State Runners-Up ===
Baseball

- (2) 1959, 2018

Girls Basketball

- (1) 1974

Football

- (3) 1989, 1992, 2018
