= Lacassine High School =

Public high school in Lacassine, Louisiana, United States

Location
- 409 Algonia Avenue; Lacassine, Louisiana; Lacassine, (Jefferson Davis Parish), Louisiana 70650; United States; 30.2352°N 92.9210°W

Information
- Type: Public high school
- School district: Jefferson Davis Parish School Board
- Principal: David Reed
- Staff: 40.41 (FTE)
- Grades: K-12
- Enrollment: 637 (2023-24)
- Student to teacher ratio: 15.76
- Colors: Red and black
- Mascot: Cardinal
- Nickname: Cardinals
- Website: www.jeffersondavis.org/lacassinehighschool

Lacassine High School is a K-12 school in Lacassine, unincorporated Jeff Davis Parish, Louisiana. It is a part of Jeff Davis Parish Public Schools.

The first school in Lacassine opened in 1907.

== Athletics ==
Lacassine High athletics competes in the LHSAA.
