= Robert G. Jones =

American politician

Robert Gambrell "Bob" Jones

Louisiana State Senator for Calcasieu and Jefferson Davis parishes
- In office 1972–1976
- Preceded by: A. C. "Ace" Clemons Jr.
- Succeeded by: William L. McLeod

Louisiana State Representative for Calcasieu and Cameron parishes
- In office 1968–1972

Personal details
- Born: May 9, 1939 (age 87) Lake Charles, Calcasieu Parish; Louisiana
- Party: Democrat-turned-Republican (1978)
- Spouse: Sarah Quinn Jones
- Children: Sam Houston Jones, II Genin Quinn Jones; Anna Gambrelle J. Guthrie Jennifer Louise J. Schindler
- Occupation: Financial Advisor 1962-2020

Robert Gambrell Jones, known as Bob Jones (born May 9, 1939), was the son of former Louisiana Governor Sam H. Jones and is a former Louisiana politician himself who served in the Louisiana House of Representatives from 1968 to 1972 and in the Louisiana State Senate from 1972 to 1976. Entering politics as a Democrat, Jones became a Republican in 1978.

Preceded by (Three at-large members)	Louisiana State Representative (At-large for Calcasieu and Cameron parishes; later District 36); Robert Gambrell "Bob" Jones (alongside Conway LeBleu, Harry Hollins, Bill McLeod and Bill Boyd); 1968–1972	Succeeded by Six members in single member districts
Preceded by A.C. "Ace" Clemons Jr.	Louisiana State Senator for Calcasieu and Jefferson Davis parishes Robert Gambrell "Bob" Jones; 1972–1976	Succeeded by William L. McLeod
