= Al Woods (American football) =

American football player (born 1987)

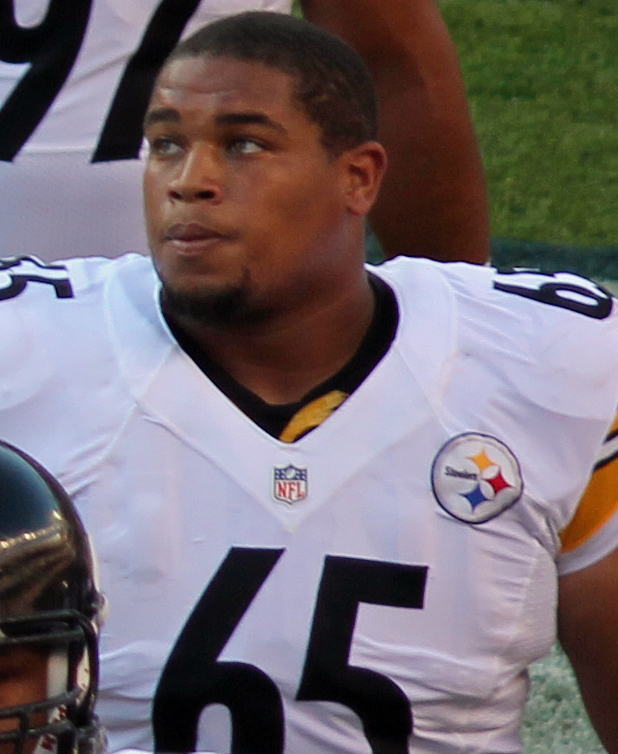
- Woods with the Pittsburgh Steelers in 2012

No. 65, 72, 90, 93, 95, 96, 99
- Position: Nose tackle

Personal information
- Born: March 25, 1987 (age 39); Jennings, Louisiana, U.S.
- Listed height: 6 ft 4 in (1.93 m)
- Listed weight: 309 lb (140 kg)

Career information
- High school: Elton (Elton, Louisiana)
- College: LSU (2006–2009)
- NFL draft: 2010: 4th round, 123rd overall pick

Career history
- New Orleans Saints (2010)*; Pittsburgh Steelers (2010)*; Tampa Bay Buccaneers (2010); Seattle Seahawks (2011); Pittsburgh Steelers (2011–2013); Tennessee Titans (2014–2016); Indianapolis Colts (2017–2018); Seattle Seahawks (2019); Jacksonville Jaguars (2020); Seattle Seahawks (2021–2022); New York Jets (2023)
- * Offseason or practice squad member only

Awards and highlights
- BCS national champion (2007)

Career NFL statistics
- Total tackles: 299
- Sacks: 10.0
- Fumble recoveries: 2
- Pass deflections: 7
- Stats at Pro Football Reference

Al Joseph Woods (born March 25, 1987) is an American former professional football player who was a nose tackle in the National Football League (NFL). He was selected by the New Orleans Saints in the fourth round of the 2010 NFL draft after playing college football for the LSU Tigers. Woods was also a member of the Pittsburgh Steelers, Tampa Bay Buccaneers, Seattle Seahawks, Tennessee Titans, Indianapolis Colts, Jacksonville Jaguars, and New York Jets.

== Professional career ==
=== Pre-draft ===
Pre-draft measurables
Height	Weight	Arm length	Hand span	40-yard dash	10-yard split	20-yard split	20-yard shuttle	Three-cone drill	Vertical jump	Broad jump	Bench press
6 ft 3 5/8 in (1.92 m)	309 lb (140 kg)	36 in (0.91 m)	11 in (0.28 m)	5.20 s	1.84 s	3.02 s	4.67 s	7.45 s	37.0 in (0.94 m)	9 ft 1 in (2.77 m)	23 reps
All values from NFL Combine/Pro Day

Woods was projected to be chosen in the third round of the 2010 NFL draft by NFLDraftScout.com.

=== New Orleans Saints ===
Woods was selected by the New Orleans Saints in the fourth round (123rd overall) of the 2010 NFL draft. He signed a four-year contract on July 15, 2010. He was released on September 4, 2010.

=== Pittsburgh Steelers (first stint) ===
On September 7, 2010, Woods was signed to the Pittsburgh Steelers' practice squad.

=== Tampa Bay Buccaneers ===
On November 2, 2010, Woods was signed off the Steelers' practice squad by the Tampa Bay Buccaneers. He was cut on September 3, 2011.

=== Seattle Seahawks (first stint) ===
Woods was claimed off waivers by the Seattle Seahawks on September 4, 2011. He was waived on November 8.

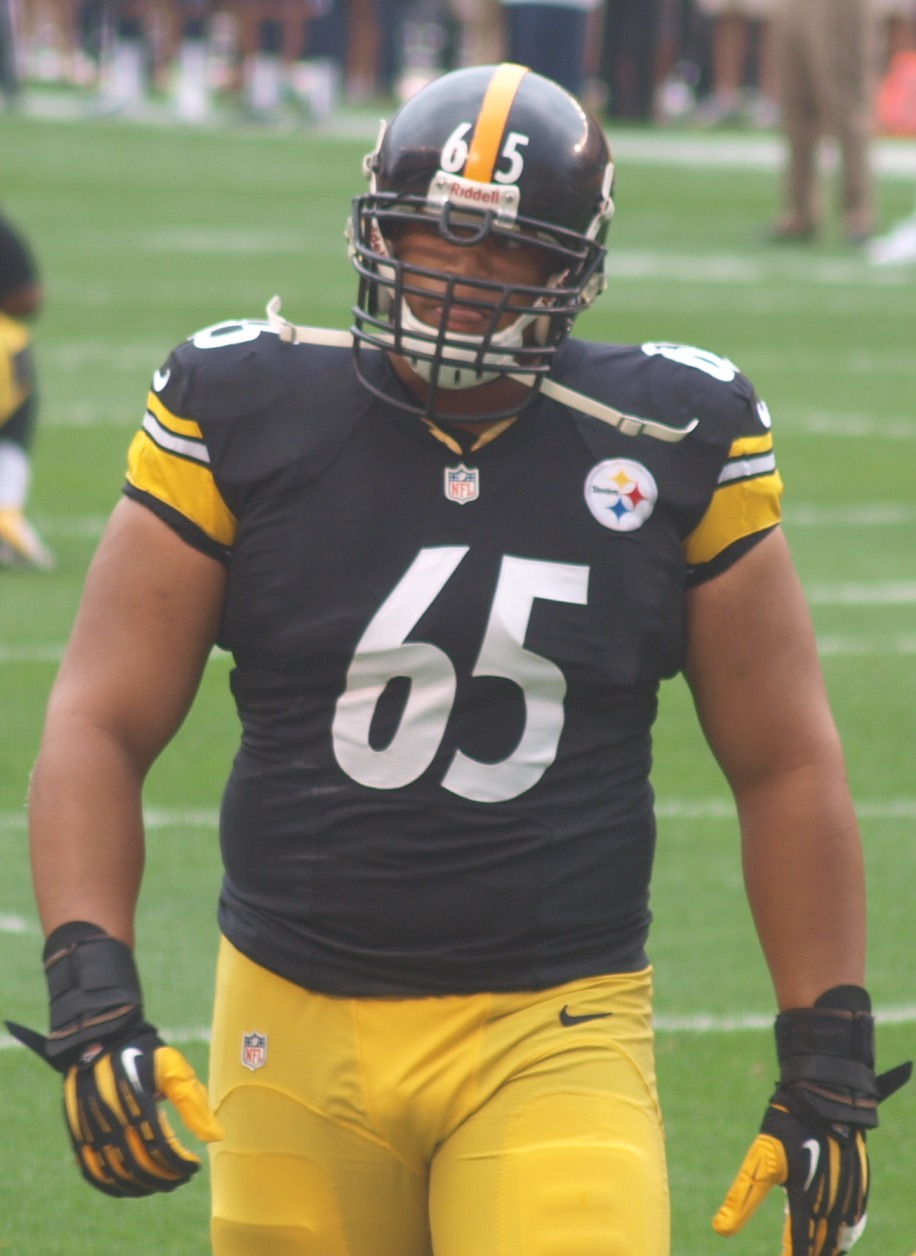
Woods with the Steelers in the 2013 season.

=== Pittsburgh Steelers (second stint) ===
The Steelers claimed him off of waivers on November 9, 2011. Woods played in 12 games during the 2012 season and the full 2013 season, starting in two.

=== Tennessee Titans ===
Woods signed with the Tennessee Titans on March 12, 2014.

On March 8, 2017, Woods was released by the Titans after 42 games, including 17 starts.

=== Indianapolis Colts ===
On March 16, 2017, Woods signed with the Indianapolis Colts. He started all 16 games, recording a career-high 44 tackles and one sack.

In 2018, Woods played in 14 games with eight games recording 24 tackles. He was placed on injured reserve on December 18, 2018.

=== Seattle Seahawks (second stint) ===
On May 10, 2019, Woods signed a one-year contract with the Seahawks. On December 20, 2019, Woods was suspended four games for violating the NFL policy on performance-enhancing substances. He was reinstated from suspension on January 13, 2020.

=== Jacksonville Jaguars ===
On April 8, 2020, Woods was signed by the Jacksonville Jaguars to a one-year, $2.75 million deal. On July 31, 2020, Woods announced he would opt out of the 2020 season due to the COVID-19 pandemic. He was released after the season on March 17, 2021.

=== Seattle Seahawks (third stint) ===
On April 5, 2021, Woods signed a one-year, $3 million contract with a $750,000 signing bonus to return to Seattle for the third time. He was a full-time starter in 2021, starting 16 games recording a career-high 50 tackles, three passes defensed, 11 QB pressures and 1.5 sacks.

On March 17, 2022, Woods re-signed with the Seahawks.

On September 5, 2022, Woods was named team captain for the Seahawks defense.

Woods played and started 14 games for the Seahawks in 2022 and logged a career high 2.0 sacks.

On March 20, 2023, Woods was released by the Seahawks.

=== New York Jets ===
On May 11, 2023, Woods signed with the New York Jets. After gathering six tackles (2 for loss) over five games, Woods tore his Achilles in the sixth game of the season against the New York Giants. The Jets put Woods on IR, ending the remainder of his 2023 NFL season.
