= Harry Hollins =

Louisiana House of Representatives member

Harry Muth Hollins

Louisiana State Representative for District 35 (Calcasieu Parish)
- In office May 1964 – March 1980
- Preceded by: Two-member district: James M. "Jim" Brown Jesse Monroe Knowles
- Succeeded by: Margaret Lowenthal

Personal details
- Born: August 25, 1932
- Died: June 29, 1989 (aged 56)
- Party: Democratic
- Occupation: Businessman

Harry Muth Hollins (August 25, 1932 – June 29, 1989) was a four-term Democratic member of the Louisiana House of Representatives from Lake Charles in Calcasieu Parish in southwestern Louisiana. His tenure extended from 1964 to 1980 during the administrations of Governors John McKeithen and Edwin Edwards.

Hollins died at the age of fifty-six. Hollins' extensive archival materials are located at McNeese State University in Lake Charles.

Political offices
Preceded by Two-member district: James M. "Jim" Brown Jesse Monroe Knowles	Louisiana State Representative for District 35 (Calcasieu Parish); 1964–1980; Served alongside: Conway LeBleu and Robert G. Jones, among others	Succeeded by Margaret Lowenthal
