= Jennings High School (Louisiana) =

Public high school in Jennings, Louisiana, United States

Location
- 2310 North Sherman Street; Jennings, (Jefferson Davis Parish), Louisiana 70546; United States; 30.2434°N 92.6509°W

Information
- Type: Public high school
- School district: Jefferson Davis Parish School Board
- Principal: Selena Gomes
- Staff: 53.86 (FTE)
- Enrollment: 775 (2024-2025)
- Student to teacher ratio: 14.39
- Colors: Maroon and white
- Mascot: Bulldog
- Nickname: Bulldogs
- Yearbook: Bulldog's Growl
- Website: www.jeffersondavis.org/jenningshighschool

Jennings High School is a junior and senior high school (grades 7–12) in Jennings, Louisiana, United States. It is a part of Jefferson Davis Parish Public Schools.

As of 2022 it has 864 students.

== Athletics ==
Jennings High athletics competes in the LHSAA.

=== State Championships ===
Football

- (3) 1908, 1939, 1992

Girls Basketball

- (6) 1949, 1968, 1970, 1988, 1989, 2011

Girls Tennis

- (2) 1969, 1970

=== State Runners-Up ===
Baseball

- (1) 2001

Boys Basketball

- (1) 1957

Football

- (6) 1929, 1930, 1942, 1946, 1982, 2019

Girls Basketball

- (3) 1948, 1961, 2010

== Notable people ==
- Travis Etienne, NFL running back for the New Orleans Saints
- Trevor Etienne, NFL running back for the Carolina Panthers
- Guy Sockrider, member of the Louisiana State Senate from Jennings from 1948 to 1964
