= AeroLites AeroSkiff =

AeroSkiff

General information
- Type: Two-seat ultralight amphibian
- National origin: United States
- Manufacturer: Aerolites
- Number built: ~9

History
- First flight: 1995

The Aerolites AeroSkiff is an American two-seat ultralight amphibian built by Aerolites Inc. The aircraft is sold either completed or as a kit for home builders.

== Design and development ==
The Aeroskiff is a braced high-wing monoplane powered by a Rotax 582 driving a pusher propeller. It has an open cockpit for a pilot and passenger and a retractable landing gear for land or sea operation.

The aircraft is too heavy for the Fédération Aéronautique Internationale microlight rules. Despite its repositionable landing gear, it can fit into the US light-sport aircraft classification since it is intended for operation on water.

== Operational history ==
By 1998 the company had reported that two examples were flying.

== Specifications ==
Data from World Directory of Leisure Aviation 2005/2006, 2011/2012 and 2015/16

General characteristics

- Crew: one
- Capacity: one passenger
- Wingspan: 29 ft 9 in (9.06 m)
- Wing area: 156 sq ft (14.5 m^{2})
- Empty weight: 564 lb (256 kg)
- Gross weight: 1,067 lb (484 kg)
- Powerplant: 1 × Rotax 582 , 65 hp (48 kW)

Performance

- Maximum speed: 95 mph (152 km/h, 83 kn)
- Stall speed: 38 mph (61 km/h, 33 kn)

== See also ==
Related lists

- List of flying boats and floatplanes
