= Avalon Daggett =

American filmmaker from Louisiana (1907–2002

Florence Avalon Daggett (1907–2002) was an American filmmaker and philanthropist. She is associated with Avalon Daggett Productions, a film production company based in Los Angeles which specialized in short documentary films, and educational films. Many of her later films were produced for the state of Louisiana.

== Biography ==
Florence Avalon Daggett born in Jennings, Jefferson Davis Parish, Louisiana and was raised on a plantation. She lived in Switzerland for a few years. She was described as being diminutive in stature. She filmed with a Bolex 16 mm film camera and her work had been honored at the Cannes Film Festival.

Daggett made documentary films about Western subjects including Native American tribes and cattle, where she made use of a technique known as tribesourcing. Tribesourcing is an approach applied to update, correct, and contextualize educational films; many of these films have historical value but the films are often containing incorrect or demeaning "facts", especially about Native Americans.

Daggett also made films about sights in her home state of Louisiana, and about Mississippi. She made a film for the Louisiana State Sovereignty Commission, entitled A Way of Life (1961).

== Philanthropy ==
After she died in 2002, the Louisiana State University Agricultural Center (LSU AgCenter) was left with an endowment for professorships by Daggett. Daggett had been friends with Dr. Joe Musick, the former director of the Rice Research Station at LSU AgCenter (near Crowley); where many of her bequeathed funds were used.

She also funded a Native American scholarship in Arizona.

== Filmography ==
- Louisiana Gayride (1949)
- Indian Pow-wow (1951)
- Smoki Snake Dance (1952)
- Villages in the Sky (1952)
- Peaceful Ones (1952)
- Warriors at Peace (1952)
- Tribe of the Turquoise Waters (1952)
- Apache (1953)
- Navajo Canyon Country (1954)
- America the Beautiful, series
- Mississippi Magic (1954)
- 66th Annual Tournament of Roses Parade (1954)
- Arizona Adventure (1954)
- Weavers of the West (1954)
- Herds West (1955)
- Father of the Southwest (1957)
- Copper, Steward of the Nation (1959)
- Roses, Pasadena, California; 1955 Theme, Familiar Sayings in Flowers
- Marshes of the Mississippi (1961)
- A Way of Life (1961), for the Louisiana State Sovereignty Commission
- Rice, America’s Food For the World (1962)
- The Big Span (ca. 1963)
- Signs, Signals and Safety (1966)
- School Bus Driver VIP (1967)
- Louisiana: The Jazz Age Meets the Space Age (1968), for Louisiana Department of Commerce and Industry (now Louisiana State Board of Commerce and Industry), Baton Rouge
- Big Piers (1968), for the Louisiana Department of Highways
- Big River Crossing (1968), for the Louisiana Department of Highways
- Swamp Expressway (1972)
