= Elton High School (Louisiana) =

Location
- 903 2nd Street; Elton, (Jefferson Davis Parish), Louisiana 70532; United States; 30.4792°N 92.6935°W

Information
- Type: Public high school
- School district: Jefferson Davis Parish School Board
- Principal: Amy Gobert
- Staff: 18.39 (FTE)
- Grades: 6-12
- Enrollment: 259 (2023-2024)
- Student to teacher ratio: 14.08
- Colors: Maroon and gold
- Nickname: Indians
- Website: www.jeffersondavis.org/eltonhighschool

Elton High School is a junior and senior high school in Elton, Louisiana, United States. It is a part of Jeff Davis Parish Public Schools. As of 2016 it has 250 students.

== Athletics ==
Elton High athletics competes in the LHSAA.

=== State Championships ===
Football

- (1) 1970

Girls Basketball

- (2) 1975, 2019

=== State Runners-Up ===
Boys Track & Field

- (2) 1975, 1995

Boys Cross Country

- (1) 1975

Girls Track & Field

- (1) 2002

== Notable alumni ==
- Al Woods, NFL defensive lineman
