= 1984 United States presidential election in Louisiana =

- November 6, 1984

Nominee	Ronald Reagan	Walter Mondale
Party	Republican	Democratic
Home state	California	Minnesota
Running mate	George H. W. Bush	Geraldine Ferraro
Electoral vote	10	0
Popular vote	1,037,299	651,586
Percentage	60.77%	38.18%
Parish results
Reagan
40–50%
50–60%
60–70%
70–80%
Mondale
40–50%
50–60%
President before election
Ronald Reagan
Republican
Elected President
Ronald Reagan
Republican

The 1984 United States presidential election in Louisiana took place on November 6, 1984. All 50 states and the District of Columbia, were part of the 1984 United States presidential election. State voters chose ten electors to the Electoral College, which selected the president and vice president of the United States. Louisiana was won by incumbent United States President Ronald Reagan of California, who was running against former Vice President Walter Mondale of Minnesota. Reagan ran for a second time with former C.I.A. Director George H. W. Bush of Texas, and Mondale ran with Representative Geraldine Ferraro of New York, the first major female candidate for the vice presidency.

== Background ==
The percentage of registered voters in Louisiana who were Republicans rose from 7.4% in 1980 to 11.3% in 1984 while the Democratic figure fell from 86.6% to 80.6%.

== Campaign ==
Governor Edwin Edwards told voters to boycott the primaries. This resulted in black voters making up a large amount of the Democratic primary electorate and a Jesse Jackson victory.

As of the 2024 presidential election, this is the last time that St. John the Baptist Parish voted for a Republican candidate. Reagan was the first Republican to ever carry the state twice.

Among white voters, 76% supported Reagan while 23% supported Mondale.

== Results ==
1984 United States presidential election in Louisiana
Party	Candidate	Votes	Percentage	Electoral votes
Republican	Ronald Reagan (incumbent)	1,037,299	60.77%	10
Democratic	Walter Mondale	651,586	38.18%	0
Citizen's Party	Sonia Johnson	9,502	0.56%	0
Independent	Lyndon LaRouche	3,552	0.21%	0
Libertarian	David Bergland	1,876 (Note: Totals for this candidate were not separated by parish but only listed as a statewide total which is included in the statewide aggregate below.)	0.11%	0
America First	Bob Richards	1,310	0.08%	0
Socialist Workers Party	Melvin Mason	1,164	0.07%	0
New Alliance Party	Dennis Serrette	533	0.03%	0
Totals		1,706,822	100.0%	10

=== Results by parish ===
Parish	Ronald Reagan Republican		Walter Mondale Democratic		Various candidates Other parties		Margin		Total votes cast
Parish	#	%	#	%	#	%	#	%	Total votes cast
Acadia	14,906	60.59%	9,262	37.65%	434	1.76%	5,644	22.94%	24,602
Allen	4,474	47.69%	4,842	51.61%	66	0.70%	-368	-3.92%	9,382
Ascension	11,945	51.55%	11,048	47.68%	177	0.77%	897	3.87%	23,170
Assumption	5,433	52.43%	4,660	44.97%	270	2.60%	773	7.46%	10,363
Avoyelles	9,402	56.39%	6,808	40.83%	463	2.78%	2,594	15.56%	16,673
Beauregard	7,353	63.13%	4,199	36.05%	96	0.82%	3,154	27.08%	11,648
Bienville	4,587	55.76%	3,530	42.91%	109	1.33%	1,057	12.85%	8,226
Bossier	22,638	76.01%	7,006	23.52%	138	0.47%	15,632	52.49%	29,782
Caddo	63,429	63.68%	35,727	35.87%	445	0.45%	27,702	27.81%	99,601
Calcasieu	35,566	51.39%	33,214	47.99%	430	0.62%	2,352	3.40%	69,210
Caldwell	3,341	69.33%	1,348	27.97%	130	2.70%	1,993	41.36%	4,819
Cameron	2,265	57.99%	1,608	41.17%	33	0.84%	657	16.82%	3,906
Catahoula	3,640	67.52%	1,649	30.59%	102	1.89%	1,991	36.93%	5,391
Claiborne	4,349	60.29%	2,788	38.65%	77	1.06%	1,561	21.64%	7,214
Concordia	6,177	63.73%	3,332	34.38%	183	1.89%	2,845	29.35%	9,692
DeSoto	5,989	55.77%	4,642	43.23%	108	1.00%	1,347	12.54%	10,739
East Baton Rouge	95,704	62.44%	56,673	36.98%	891	0.58%	39,031	25.46%	153,268
East Carroll	1,974	47.77%	2,089	50.56%	69	1.67%	-115	-2.79%	4,132
East Feliciana	4,166	49.59%	4,122	49.07%	113	1.34%	44	0.52%	8,401
Evangeline	8,680	54.78%	6,981	44.06%	183	1.16%	1,699	10.72%	15,844
Franklin	6,708	67.80%	2,937	29.68%	249	2.52%	3,771	38.12%	9,894
Grant	5,334	65.88%	2,588	31.96%	175	2.16%	2,746	33.92%	8,097
Iberia	17,727	62.14%	10,170	35.65%	629	2.21%	7,557	26.49%	28,526
Iberville	6,455	42.58%	8,587	56.65%	117	0.77%	-2,132	-14.07%	15,159
Jackson	5,034	64.86%	2,568	33.09%	159	2.05%	2,466	31.77%	7,761
Jefferson	123,997	74.69%	41,183	24.81%	843	0.50%	82,814	49.88%	166,023
Jefferson Davis	8,296	57.36%	5,962	41.22%	206	1.42%	2,334	16.14%	14,464
Lafayette	44,344	68.80%	19,265	29.89%	849	1.31%	25,079	38.91%	64,458
Lafourche	20,930	65.40%	10,186	31.83%	889	2.77%	10,744	33.57%	32,005
LaSalle	5,404	78.60%	1,318	19.17%	153	2.23%	4,086	59.43%	6,875
Lincoln	9,087	61.81%	5,432	36.95%	182	1.24%	3,655	24.86%	14,701
Livingston	17,465	65.72%	8,913	33.54%	198	0.74%	8,552	32.18%	26,576
Madison	2,849	48.58%	2,906	49.56%	109	1.86%	-57	-0.98%	5,864
Morehouse	8,585	62.73%	4,829	35.29%	271	1.98%	3,756	27.44%	13,685
Natchitoches	8,836	58.99%	5,806	38.76%	336	2.25%	3,030	20.23%	14,978
Orleans	86,316	41.71%	119,478	57.73%	1,162	0.56%	-33,162	-16.02%	206,956
Ouachita	37,270	69.57%	15,525	28.98%	779	1.45%	21,745	40.59%	53,574
Plaquemines	7,655	69.74%	3,261	29.71%	61	0.55%	4,394	40.03%	10,977
Pointe Coupee	5,477	44.58%	6,732	54.79%	78	0.63%	-1,255	-10.21%	12,287
Rapides	32,879	65.81%	16,121	32.27%	963	1.92%	16,758	33.54%	49,963
Red River	3,060	60.39%	1,958	38.64%	49	0.97%	1,102	21.75%	5,067
Richland	5,980	65.84%	2,918	32.13%	185	2.03%	3,062	33.71%	9,083
Sabine	6,295	66.26%	2,980	31.37%	225	2.37%	3,315	34.89%	9,500
St. Bernard	24,428	74.80%	8,076	24.73%	153	0.47%	16,352	50.07%	32,657
St. Charles	10,185	59.62%	6,784	39.71%	113	0.67%	3,401	19.91%	17,082
St. Helena	2,366	43.53%	2,956	54.39%	113	2.08%	-590	-10.86%	5,435
St. James	4,627	43.10%	5,989	55.79%	119	1.11%	-1,362	-12.69%	10,735
St. John the Baptist	9,093	53.96%	7,646	45.37%	112	0.67%	1,447	8.59%	16,851
St. Landry	19,055	51.19%	17,950	48.22%	218	0.59%	1,105	2.97%	37,223
St. Martin	9,698	52.17%	8,589	46.20%	304	1.63%	1,109	5.97%	18,591
St. Mary	15,275	61.16%	9,411	37.68%	288	1.16%	5,864	23.48%	24,974
St. Tammany	38,664	76.15%	11,719	23.08%	392	0.77%	26,945	53.07%	50,775
Tangipahoa	19,580	60.10%	12,799	39.29%	200	0.61%	6,781	20.81%	32,579
Tensas	1,956	53.52%	1,628	44.54%	71	1.94%	328	8.98%	3,655
Terrebonne	23,696	69.51%	9,640	28.28%	753	2.21%	14,056	41.23%	34,089
Union	6,585	67.73%	2,916	29.99%	222	2.28%	3,669	37.74%	9,723
Vermilion	12,721	56.85%	9,033	40.37%	624	2.78%	3,688	16.48%	22,378
Vernon	9,035	67.58%	4,076	30.49%	258	1.93%	4,959	37.09%	13,369
Washington	11,185	58.91%	7,680	40.45%	123	0.64%	3,505	18.46%	18,988
Webster	12,055	64.54%	6,509	34.85%	113	0.61%	5,546	29.69%	18,677
West Baton Rouge	4,189	47.16%	4,631	52.13%	63	0.71%	-442	-4.97%	8,883
West Carroll	3,874	70.84%	1,474	26.95%	121	2.21%	2,400	43.89%	5,469
West Feliciana	2,097	47.38%	2,296	51.88%	33	0.74%	-199	-4.50%	4,426
Winn	4,934	63.85%	2,633	34.08%	160	2.07%	2,301	29.77%	7,727
Totals	1,037,299	60.77%	651,586	38.18%	17,937	1.05%	385,713	22.59%	1,706,822

==== Parishes that flipped from Democratic to Republican ====
- Ascension
- Assumption
- Beauregard
- Bienville
- Calcasieu
- Cameron
- DeSoto
- East Feliciana
- Livingston
- Jefferson Davis
- Natchitoches
- Red River
- Sabine
- St. Charles
- St. John the Baptist
- St. Landry
- St. Martin
- St. Mary
- Tangipahoa
- Tensas
- Vernon
- Washington

== See also ==
- United States presidential elections in Louisiana
- Presidency of Ronald Reagan

== Works cited ==
- Black, Earl; Black, Merle (1992). The Vital South: How Presidents Are Elected. Harvard University Press. ISBN 0674941306.
- Steed, Robert; Moreland, Laurence; Baker, Tod, eds. (1994). The 1992 Presidential Election in the South: Current Patterns of Southern Party and Electoral Politics. Praeger Publishers. ISBN 0275945340.
