= Jesse Monroe Knowles =

American politician

Louisiana State Senator for Calcasieu and surrounding parishes)
- In office 1964–1980
- Preceded by: Guy Sockrider
- Succeeded by: Clifford L. Newman

Louisiana State Representative for Calcasieu Parish
- In office 1960–1964
- Preceded by: Horace Lynn Jones; Lon Tyndall
- Succeeded by: Mike L. Hogan; Harry Hollins; A. J. "Tubby" Lyons

Personal details
- Born: July 23, 1919 Merryville, Louisiana, United States
- Died: April 23, 2006 (aged 86)
- Party: Democrat-turned-Republican (1980)
- Spouse: Helen Noel Knowles
- Occupation: Business, supervisor for Amoco

Jesse Monroe Knowles (July 23, 1919 – April 23, 2006) was an American businessman, civic leader, and politician, elected as a Democratic Party member to both houses of the Louisiana State Legislature for Calcasieu Parish. He served a total of twenty years in both chambers.

From the late 1960s, the Republican Party had been attracting white southern conservatives into its ranks. In the last weeks of his last term as state senator in 1980, Knowles switched to the GOP. He had supported Republican David C. Treen for governor of Louisiana in 1979 and was appointed to state posts.

From Lake Charles, Knowles was a United States Army Air Forces veteran and a survivor of the Bataan Death March in World War II. He was active in veterans' affairs and groups following his service during the war and served as national president of the 27th Bombardment Group Association.

== Early life and education ==
Knowles was born in Merryville in Beauregard Parish, but his family moved to Lake Charles in 1935. Knowles graduated from Lake Charles High School (renamed Lake Charles Boston High School after consolidation).

== Military service ==
In 1939, Knowles enlisted in the Army Air Corps and served in the Pacific Theater of Operations, where he was captured in 1942 by the Japanese army at Bataan. Surviving the Bataan Death March, he was held in a number of prison camps for more than two years, a total of 1,228 days. He was last held in the camp in Mukden, Manchuria, where he was liberated by United States forces on August 15, 1945. The Death March was featured in a National Broadcasting Company documentary in 1982 entitled The Forgotten Hell.

After Knowles was discharged from the military, he went to work as a draftsman for Amoco Oil Company. He became a fee land supervisor. Retiring in 1984 after thirty-eight years of service with Amoco, he later worked for the Lake Charles River Pilots.

== Entering Louisiana politics ==
Knowles had joined the Democratic Party when it held nearly every public office in Louisiana. At the turn of the 20th century, Louisiana and other former Confederate states disenfranchised most blacks by raising barriers to voter registration. This move dramatically weakened the Republican Party in the South.

In 1969, Knowles emerged as a leading critic of sex education in public schools, an issue that was controversial in a period of social change. He referred to the Sexuality Information and Education Council of the United States, which prepared much of the sex education curriculum then under consideration, as "a communist conspiracy". He supported a measure to withdraw state funds from school districts that followed the suggested SIEUS curriculum. State Senator Edgar G. "Sonny" Mouton, Jr., of Lafayette, said that sponsors of the punitive legislation, including Knowles, were "storm troopers".

Early in 1980, Knowles, with just a few weeks remaining in his state senate term, Knowles switched his party affiliation to Republican, and Governor Treen appointed Knowles as the secretary of the Department of Wildlife and Fisheries. Knowles, however, had to retire from office after suffering a heart attack twelve days into his appointment. After he recovered, Governor Treen appointed him to the Louisiana Rice Promotion Board. Knowles was also elected to the board of directors of the Louisiana Rice Council, of which he was later the president.

== See also ==
Political offices
Preceded by Two-member district: A. C. Clemons Guy Sockrider	Louisiana State Senator for Calcasieu and surrounding parishes Jesse Monroe Knowles (alongside A. C. Clemons in first two terms); 1964–1980	Succeeded by Clifford L. Newman
Preceded by Two-member district: Horace Lynn Jones Lon Tyndall	Louisiana State Representative for Calcasieu Parish; Jesse Monroe Knowles; 1960–1964	Succeeded by Mike L. Hogan Harry Hollins A. J. "Tubby" Lyons
