= AeroLites Bearcat =

American homebuilt aircraft

Bearcat

General information
- Type: Amateur-built aircraft
- National origin: United States
- Manufacturer: AeroLites
- Status: In production (2012)

History
- First flight: 1984

The AeroLites Bearcat is an American amateur-built aircraft, designed and produced by AeroLites, of Welsh, Louisiana and introduced in 1984. The aircraft is supplied as a kit for amateur construction.

== Design and development ==
The Bearcat features a strut-braced parasol-wing, a single-seat open cockpit, fixed conventional landing gear and a single engine in tractor configuration.

The aircraft fuselage is made from welded 4130 steel tubing with the wing constructed with an aluminum structure, with its flying surfaces covered in Dacron sailcloth. The ribs slide into pockets in the fabric. Its 30 ft (9.1 m) span wing employs a Clark Y airfoil and has an area of 150 sq ft (14 m^{2}). Standard engines available are the 40 hp (30 kW) Rotax 447, the 50 hp (37 kW) Rotax 503 and the 64 hp (48 kW) Rotax 582 two-stroke powerplants. Equipment to convert the aircraft for aerial application is also available.

The manufacturer claims that the supplied kit takes 60–90 hours to assemble.

== Operational history ==
By 1998 the company had reported that nine Bearcats and two Ag Bearcats were flying.

== Variants ==
Bearcat
Base model
Ag Bearcat
Model equipped as an agricultural aircraft, originally equipped with a 64 hp (48 kW) Rotax 532 engine.

== Specifications (Bearcat) ==
Data from Bayerl and AeroLites

General characteristics

- Crew: one
- Length: 17 ft 6 in (5.33 m)
- Wingspan: 30 ft 0 in (9.14 m)
- Height: 6 ft 5 in (1.96 m)
- Wing area: 150 sq ft (14 m^{2})
- Empty weight: 275 lb (125 kg)
- Gross weight: 700 lb (318 kg)
- Fuel capacity: 5 U.S. gallons (19 L; 4.2 imp gal)
- Powerplant: 1 × Rotax 447 twin cylinder, air-cooled, two stroke aircraft engine, 40 hp (30 kW)
- Propellers: 2-bladed composite, 5 ft 8 in (1.73 m) diameter

Performance

- Maximum speed: 70 mph (110 km/h, 61 kn)
- Cruise speed: 60 mph (96 km/h, 52 kn)
- Stall speed: 27 mph (43 km/h, 23 kn)
- Never exceed speed: 110 mph (180 km/h, 96 kn)
- g limits: +6/-4
- Rate of climb: 750 ft/min (3.8 m/s)
- Wing loading: 4.66 lb/sq ft (22.8 kg/m^{2})
