= Lake Arthur, Louisiana =

- Town
- Location of Lake Arthur in Jefferson Davis Parish, Louisiana

- Location of Louisiana in the United States
- Coordinates: 30°7′0″N 92°40′37″W
- Country: United States
- State: Louisiana
- Parish: Jefferson Davis

Government
  - Mayor: Sampson “poncho” lejeune

Area
  - Total: 2.43 sq mi (6.29 km^{2})
  - Land: 1.85 sq mi (4.80 km^{2})
  - Water: 0.58 sq mi (1.49 km^{2})
- Elevation: 7 ft (2.1 m)

Population (2020)
  - Total: 2,595
  - Density: 1,399.6/sq mi (540.39/km^{2})
- Time zone: UTC-6 (CST)
  - Summer (DST): UTC-5 (CDT)
- ZIP code: 70549
- Area code: 337
- FIPS code: 22-41050
- Website: www.townoflakearthur.org

Lake Arthur is a town in Jefferson Davis Parish, Louisiana, United States. As of the 2020 census, Lake Arthur had a population of 2,595. It is part of the Jennings Micropolitan Statistical Area. The current mayor is Sampson “poncho” Lejeune.

== History ==
The lake and the abundant wildlife near Lake Arthur made the place an early camping ground for Native Americans, most likely Atakapas, although there were also Comanche Indians in the area at times during the era just before European settlement. Before Lake Arthur, first settled was a little village that was south and across the lake called Lakeside and also the area called Shell Beach.

Acadian families moved to the area in the late 1700s. They called the lake le petit lac Mentau. "Mentau" was the name of an Atakapas Indian chief who had lived in the area. One of those early Acadians was Arthur LeBlanc, and travelers passing through the country began to refer to the lake as le lac d'Arthur, and through time, it evolved into the present name, Lake Arthur.

"In 1811 Atanas Hebert came to Lake Arthur to settle. That marks a date we can follow with accuracy." The first store was operated by D. D. Hebert.

1840 The first sawmill was established in the area. Cypress timber drew most of the early people.

1854 Gustave Laurents owned and operated a store. Early settlers were noble Creoles from New Orleans. Jean Revlon built a large residence in 1854. Today it is known as MacDonell plantation. The deLaunays, Deschamps and Gaithes, all who were in the French Revolution came from New Orleans.

At first, they grew corn and other crops, but found that rice was the crop to grow.
1876 The first rice mill was built by Gustave Laurents and D. Derouen.
1887 Anatole Gauthier and C. St Germain brought in the first rice thresher and portable steam boiler.
1890 The first rice irrigation pumping plant was built on Bayou Lacassine. All of this turned Lake Arthur into successful rice country.

One of the largest families in the area was Broussard. It is almost impossible to pinpoint which one arrived first. T.E. Theogene Broussard was a druggist in Lake Arthur.

1878 The first post office was opened with D. Derouen as postmaster. Mail was received once a month from Leesburg (Cameron), and once in a while by horseback from Lake Charles.

1889 Construction of The Live Oak Hotel was well on its way by 1888. Construction was completed in February 1889. One of its guests was Franklin D. Roosevelt, who came to Lake Arthur to hunt before he was stricken by polio. The Live Oak was maintained and operated as a private hotel until 1922, when it was sold to the Lake Arthur Hunting Club. It was torn down in 1934.

Boat captains were an important part of early settlers lives. The lake is about one mile wide and nine miles long and connects with the Mermentau River, a waterway to the Gulf of Mexico.
1886 D. E. Sweet bought the "Louisa Storm" and "Olive" which made trips to Grand Chenier for 17 years. This was that only means of travel between Lake Arthur and Cameron Parish.

A lumber boom began not long after the town was laid out, with two sawmills. Lumber barons were Aaron Streater and Pete Reimers.
1890 Lee Fox built the first sawmill within the Lake Arthur corporate limits; it was destroyed by fire in 1905, as was the Brewer, Reynolds and Streater Mill that had been built on the lake front in 1900. Besides the mills, lumber covering several acres went up in smoke. More than 5 million feet of cypress lumber was lost.

1890 The Lake Arthur Town Lot and Land Co. planned the original town. This company was composed of Samuel Marquet, E. L. Lee, W. E. Chapin, and H. C. Kellog. These men were all from the state of Iowa. Later, Samuel Marquet bought all the interest in the town site.

1903 A petition signed by a majority of the land holders was submitted to the governor asking that Lake Arthur be incorporated as a village. Names on the petition for incorporation were Dr. V. A. Miller, E. S. Streater, F. A. Smith, J. H. Jeppeson, George S. Wheeler, A. D. Spooner, Nick Arend, H. E. Sergrist, John L. Walter, A. G. Streater, F. R Gibbs, P. T. Reimers, John Lovell, L. N. Toups, M. Broussard, J. F. Ney, W.H. Ney, J. F. Kestner, George Bailey, and T. E. Broussard. Lake Arthur was incorporated in 1904, and Dr. Miller was chosen as its first mayor.

1904 Southern Pacific Railroad came from Lake Charles.

1922 Lake Arthur was made an independent parish by Bishop Jules B. Jeanmard of Lafayette. Rev. W. E. Allen was the first pastor of Our Lady of the Lake Parish. He retired in 1935, and Rev. L. E deMonsabert was made pastor.

Today Lake Arthur citizens are a mixture of Acadians and French, and Anglo-Americans who arrived from the state of Iowa during the 1890s.

== Geography ==
The town is in southeastern Jefferson Davis Parish, on the north shore of Lake Arthur, a tidal section of the Mermentau River. The town limits extend into the center of the lake, which is the Vermilion Parish line. Louisiana Highway 14 passes through the town center, leading west 44 miles (71 km) to Lake Charles. To the east Highway 14 crosses the Mermentau River at its mouth then leads 36 miles (58 km) to Abbeville. Louisiana Highway 26 has its southern terminus in Lake Arthur and leads north 10 miles (16 km) to Jennings.

According to the United States Census Bureau, the town of Lake Arthur has a total area of 2.4 square miles (6.3 km^{2}), of which 1.9 square miles (4.8 km^{2}) are land and 0.58 square miles (1.5 km^{2}), or 23.67%, are water.

=== Climate ===
Lake Arthur has a humid subtropical climate (Köppen: Cfa) with hot summers and mild summers.

Climate data for Lake Arthur 7 SW, Louisiana (1991–2020 normals, extremes 1901–present)
Month	Jan	Feb	Mar	Apr	May	Jun	Jul	Aug	Sep	Oct	Nov	Dec	Year
Record high °F (°C)	91 (33)	87 (31)	92 (33)	94 (34)	99 (37)	103 (39)	102 (39)	105 (41)	105 (41)	99 (37)	90 (32)	85 (29)	105 (41)
Mean maximum °F (°C)	75.8 (24.3)	77.7 (25.4)	82.3 (27.9)	86.3 (30.2)	90.4 (32.4)	95.0 (35.0)	96.1 (35.6)	97.4 (36.3)	95.3 (35.2)	90.3 (32.4)	83.4 (28.6)	77.8 (25.4)	98.2 (36.8)
Mean daily maximum °F (°C)	61.4 (16.3)	65.6 (18.7)	71.6 (22.0)	77.6 (25.3)	83.5 (28.6)	89.9 (32.2)	91.4 (33.0)	92.0 (33.3)	88.8 (31.6)	81.0 (27.2)	71.2 (21.8)	63.4 (17.4)	78.1 (25.6)
Daily mean °F (°C)	52.4 (11.3)	56.2 (13.4)	62.4 (16.9)	68.6 (20.3)	75.7 (24.3)	81.7 (27.6)	83.2 (28.4)	83.1 (28.4)	79.3 (26.3)	70.7 (21.5)	61.0 (16.1)	54.1 (12.3)	69.0 (20.6)
Mean daily minimum °F (°C)	43.5 (6.4)	46.7 (8.2)	53.3 (11.8)	59.6 (15.3)	68.0 (20.0)	73.4 (23.0)	74.9 (23.8)	74.2 (23.4)	69.8 (21.0)	60.5 (15.8)	50.7 (10.4)	44.9 (7.2)	60.0 (15.6)
Mean minimum °F (°C)	27.8 (−2.3)	33.1 (0.6)	37.6 (3.1)	45.2 (7.3)	55.5 (13.1)	66.9 (19.4)	70.1 (21.2)	69.5 (20.8)	59.6 (15.3)	45.7 (7.6)	35.6 (2.0)	31.2 (−0.4)	26.2 (−3.2)
Record low °F (°C)	13 (−11)	11 (−12)	25 (−4)	34 (1)	42 (6)	53 (12)	61 (16)	58 (14)	41 (5)	34 (1)	23 (−5)	18 (−8)	11 (−12)
Average precipitation inches (mm)	5.61 (142)	4.20 (107)	3.10 (79)	4.75 (121)	4.61 (117)	6.17 (157)	4.99 (127)	6.08 (154)	5.85 (149)	4.51 (115)	5.25 (133)	4.78 (121)	59.90 (1,521)
Average snowfall inches (cm)	0.0 (0.0)	0.0 (0.0)	0.0 (0.0)	0.0 (0.0)	0.0 (0.0)	0.0 (0.0)	0.0 (0.0)	0.0 (0.0)	0.0 (0.0)	0.0 (0.0)	0.0 (0.0)	0.1 (0.25)	0.1 (0.25)
Average precipitation days (≥ 0.01 in)	12.3	11.1	10.1	7.6	7.3	12.3	13.0	12.7	10.9	9.3	10.3	12.7	129.6
Average snowy days (≥ 0.1 in)	0.0	0.0	0.0	0.0	0.0	0.0	0.0	0.0	0.0	0.0	0.0	0.1	0.1
Source: NOAA

== Demographics ==
Historical population
Census	Pop.	Note	%±
1910	1,093		—
1920	1,882		72.2%
1930	1,602		−14.9%
1940	2,131		33.0%
1950	2,849		33.7%
1960	3,541		24.3%
1970	3,551		0.3%
1980	3,615		1.8%
1990	3,194		−11.6%
2000	3,007		−5.9%
2010	2,738		−8.9%
2020	2,595		−5.2%
2025 (est.)	2,569	▼	−1.0%
U.S. Decennial Census

Lake Arthur racial composition as of 2020
Race	Number	Percentage
White (non-Hispanic)	2,145	82.66%
Black or African American (non-Hispanic)	300	11.56%
Native American	2	0.08%
Asian	2	0.08%
Pacific Islander	1	0.04%
Other/Mixed	109	4.2%
Hispanic or Latino	36	1.39%

As of the 2020 United States census, there were 2,595 people, 982 households, and 737 families residing in the town.

== Education ==
Jefferson Davis Parish Public Schools operates public schools in Lake Arthur. Schools serving Lake Arthur include Lake Arthur Elementary School (PK-6) in Lake Arthur and Lake Arthur High School (7–12) in a nearby unincorporated area.

Jefferson Davis Parish Library operates the Lake Arthur Branch at 600 4th Street.

== See also ==
- KJMH
