= Lake Arthur High School =

Location
- 4374 Tiger Lane; Lake Arthur, (Jefferson Davis Parish), Louisiana 70549; United States; 30.0969°N 92.6693°W

Information
- Type: Public high school
- School district: Jefferson Davis Parish School Board
- Principal: Amanda Fontenot
- Staff: 25.28 (FTE)
- Enrollment: 390 (2023-2024)
- Student to teacher ratio: 15.43
- Colors: Red and blue
- Mascot: Tiger
- Nickname: Tigers
- Website: www.jeffersondavis.org/lakearthurhighschool

Lake Arthur High School (LAHS) is a grade 7-12 junior and senior high school in unincorporated Jefferson Davis Parish, Louisiana, United States, near Lake Arthur.

== Athletics ==
Lake Arthur High athletics compete in the LHSAA.

=== State Championships ===
Girls Basketball

- (2) 1976, 2021

=== State Runners-Up ===
Boys Basketball

- (1) 1956

Girls Basketball

- (1) 2018
