= AeroLites =

Aircraft manufacturer

AeroLites Inc.
- Company type: Privately held company
- Industry: Aerospace
- Founded: before 1984
- Headquarters: Welsh, Louisiana, United States
- Key people: President: Daniel J Rochè
- Products: Kit aircraft
- Website: www.homebuilt.org/kits/aerolites/aerolites.html

AeroLites Inc. is an American aircraft manufacturer based in Welsh, Louisiana. In business since at least 1984, the company president is Daniel J Rochè. The company specializes in the design and manufacture of light aircraft in the form of plans and kits for amateur construction.

The company motto is "Innovators Of Aviation Efficiency".

== Products ==
The company offers three aircraft designs, the single-seat AeroLites AeroMaster AG ultralight agricultural aircraft, the two-seat amphibious AeroLites AeroSkiff and the single-seat AeroLites Bearcat parasol wing design. All three designs emphasize simplicity and ease of construction. The AeroSkiff is also available fully assembled.

The Bearcat was introduced in 1984, and by 1998 the company reported that it had sold a total 17 aircraft of all three models, including 11 Bearcats.

== Aircraft ==
Summary of aircraft built by AeroLites
Model name	First flight	Number built	Type
AeroLites AeroMaster AG		4 (1998)	single-seat ultralight agricultural aircraft
AeroLites AeroSkiff		2 (1998)	two-seat amphibious flying boat
AeroLites Bearcat	1984	11 (1998)	single-seat parasol wing ultralight and agricultural aircraft
