= Jefferson Davis Parish Public Schools =

School in Louisiana, United States

Location
- Jennings, Louisiana, United States

District information
- Type: Public school district
- Grades: PK, K–12

Students and staff
- Students: ~5,210

Other information
- Website: www.jeffersondavis.org

Jefferson Davis Parish Public Schools or Jefferson Davis Parish School Board (JDPSB) is a school district headquartered in Jennings, Louisiana, United States.

The district covers Jefferson Davis Parish.

== School uniforms ==
The district requires all students to wear school uniforms.

== Schools ==
=== K-12 schools ===
- Hathaway High School (Unincorporated area)
- Lacassine High School (Unincorporated area)

=== 6-12 schools ===
- Elton High School (Elton)

=== 7-12 schools ===
- Lake Arthur High School (Unincorporated area)
- Jennings High School (Jennings)

=== 9-12 schools ===
- Welsh High School (Welsh)

=== PK-8 schools ===
- Fenton Elementary/Junior High School (Fenton)

=== 6-8 schools ===
- Welsh-Roanoke Junior High School (Unincorporated area)

=== PK-6 schools ===
- Lake Arthur Elementary School (Lake Arthur)
- Jennings Elementary School (Jennings)

=== PK-5 schools ===
- Elton Elementary School (Elton)
- Welsh Elementary School (Welsh)

=== PK-2 schools ===
- Ward Elementary School (Jennings)

=== Alternative Education ===
- James Ward Center for Excellence
