= Trevor Etienne =

American football player (born 2004)

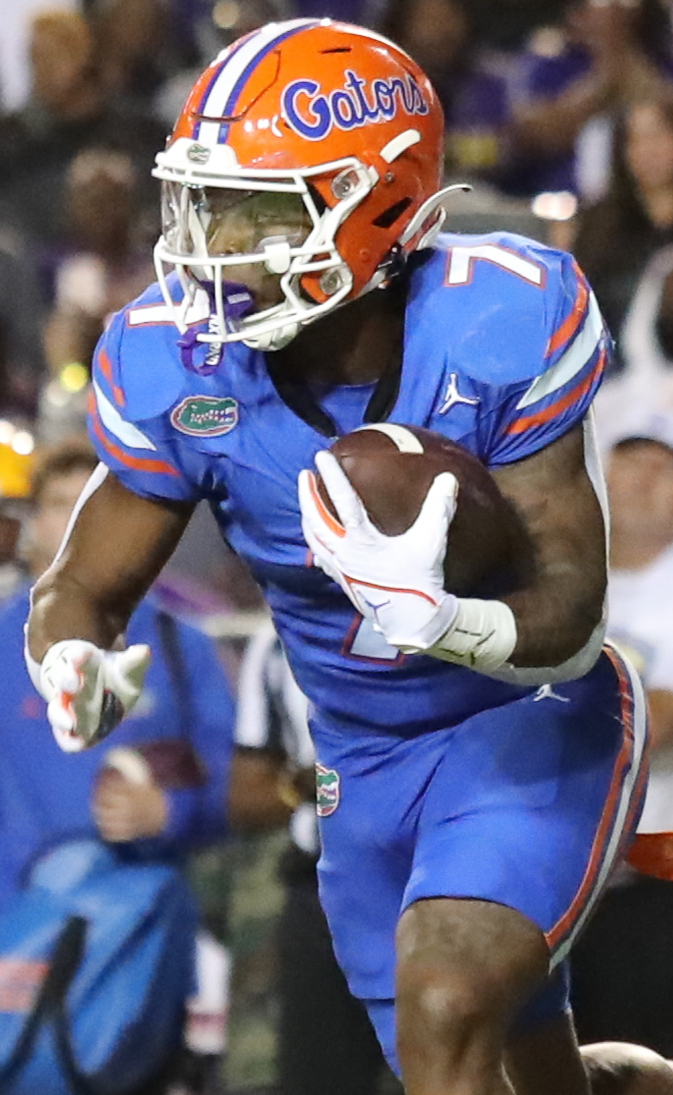
- Etienne with the Florida Gators in 2023

No. 23 – Carolina Panthers
- Positions: Running back, return specialist
- Roster status: Active

Personal information
- Born: July 9, 2004 (age 22); Jennings, Louisiana, U.S.
- Listed height: 5 ft 9 in (1.75 m)
- Listed weight: 204 lb (93 kg)

Career information
- High school: Jennings (Jennings, Louisiana)
- College: Florida (2022–2023); Georgia (2024)
- NFL draft: 2025: 4th round, 114th overall pick

Career history
- Carolina Panthers (2025–present)

Awards and highlights
- SEC All-Freshman Team (2022)

Career NFL statistics as of 2025
- Rushing yards: 94
- Rushing average: 4.7
- Receptions: 3
- Receiving yards: 13
- Return yards: 896
- Stats at Pro Football Reference

Trevor Etienne (US: /ˈeɪtʃæn/ AY-chan; born July 9, 2004) is an American professional football running back and return specialist for the Carolina Panthers of the National Football League (NFL). He played college football for the Florida Gators and Georgia Bulldogs. Etienne was selected by the Panthers in the fourth round of the 2025 NFL draft. He is the younger brother of NFL player Travis Etienne.

== Early life ==
Etienne attended Jennings High School in Jennings, Louisiana. During his high school career, Etienne rushed for 2,455 yards and 34 touchdowns. As a senior, he recorded 1,344 rushing yards along with 20 touchdowns and was named to the All-American Bowl Roster. A top running back in the class of 2022, Etienne committed to play college football at the University of Florida over offers from Clemson and LSU.

== College career ==
=== Florida ===
In Etienne's first collegiate game, he would tally 63 yards on five carries, before rushing for his first career touchdown the following week against Kentucky. Against USF, he would rush for the go-ahead touchdown in a 31−28 victory. Etienne would go on to score touchdowns against LSU and Georgia. He rushed for 719 yards and six touchdowns as a freshman in 2022 and was named to the SEC All-Freshman Team.

The following season, in a game against No. 11 Tennessee, Etienne rushed for a career-high 173 yards with 23 carries and a touchdown, helping lead Florida to a 29−16 upset victory. As a result, he was named the Doak Walker Running Back of the Week. Against No. 19 LSU, Etienne rushed for 99 yards and a career-high three touchdowns, in a 52−35 defeat. Etienne finished the season, rushing for 753 yards and eight touchdowns. On December 7, 2023, Etienne announced his decision to enter the transfer portal.

=== Georgia ===
On December 24, 2023, Etienne announced that he would transfer to the University of Georgia to play for the Bulldogs. In March 2024, Etienne was arrested for DUI and reckless driving. Against No. 1 Texas, he rushed for 87 yards and three touchdowns, helping lead Georgia to 30−15 victory. In the 2024 SEC Championship Game, he rushed for 94 yards and two touchdowns, including the game winning score in overtime, as Georgia won 22−19 in a rematch with No. 2 Texas. Etienne finished his first season at Georgia rushing for 609 yards and nine touchdowns.

On January 15, 2025, Etienne declared for the 2025 NFL draft.

== Professional career ==
Pre-draft measurables
Height	Weight	Arm length	Hand span	Wingspan	40-yard dash	10-yard split	20-yard split	20-yard shuttle	Three-cone drill	Vertical jump	Broad jump	Bench press
5 ft 8 3/4 in (1.75 m)	198 lb (90 kg)	29 1/4 in (0.74 m)	9 1/2 in (0.24 m)	5 ft 10 1/2 in (1.79 m)	4.42 s	1.51 s	2.58 s	4.34 s	7.20 s	35.0 in (0.89 m)	10 ft 4 in (3.15 m)	15 reps
All values from NFL Combine/Pro Day

Etienne was selected by the Carolina Panthers with the 114th overall pick in the fourth round of the 2025 NFL draft. He appeared in all 17 contests for the Panthers during the regular season, recording 20 rush attempts for 94 yards, as well as three receptions for 13 yards. In Carolina's Wild Card round matchup against the Los Angeles Rams, Etienne muffed a punt that was recovered by Troy Reeder, ultimately leading to a 31−34 loss.

On August 30, 2026, Etienne was placed on injured reserve due to an ankle injury. He was activated on October 17.

== Career statistics ==
College statistics
Year	Team	Games	Rushing				Receiving			
Year	Team	GP	Att	Yards	Avg	TD	Rec	Yards	Avg	TD
2022	Florida	13	118	719	6.1	6	9	66	7.3	0
2023	Florida	11	131	753	5.7	8	21	172	8.2	1
2024	Georgia	10	122	609	5.0	9	32	194	6.1	0
Career		34	371	2,081	5.6	23	58	432	7.0	1
