= A. C. Clemons =

American politician

A.C. Clemons

Member of the Louisiana Senate from the 14 district
- In office 1960–1972

Personal details
- Born: April 16, 1921
- Died: October 16, 1992 (aged 71)
- Party: Republican (1970–1992); Democratic (until 1970)

A. C. Clemons Jr. (April 16, 1921 – October 19, 1992) was an American politician who served in the Louisiana Senate from 1960 to 1972. He originally was a Democrat but switched to the Republican Party in 1970, making him the first Republican in the Louisiana Senate since the 19th century.

Preceded by Arsene Stewart	Louisiana State Senator for District 14; A. C. "Ace" Clemons, Jr. (alongside Guy Sockrider and Jesse Monroe Knowles); 1960–1972	Succeeded by Robert G. Jones
