= Welsh, Louisiana =

- Town
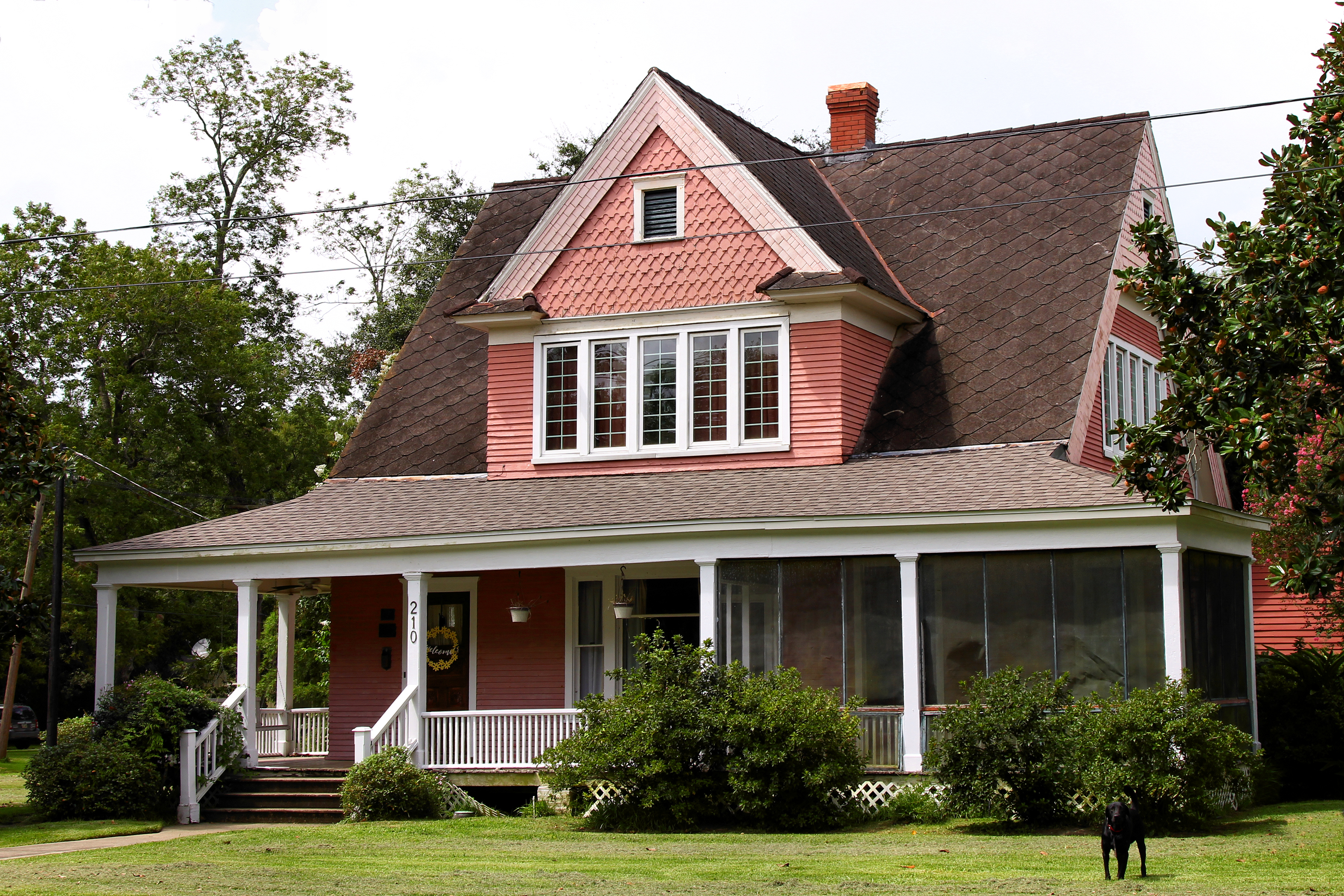
- The historic Calkins-Orvis House.

- Location of Welsh in Jefferson Davis Parish, Louisiana.

- Location of Louisiana in the United States
- Coordinates: 30°14′15″N 92°49′44″W
- Country: United States
- State: Louisiana
- Parish: Jefferson Davis
- Founded: March 15, 1888

Government
  - Mayor: Karl Arceneaux (elected 2020)

Area
  - Total: 6.44 sq mi (16.69 km^{2})
  - Land: 6.32 sq mi (16.38 km^{2})
  - Water: 0.12 sq mi (0.31 km^{2})
- Elevation: 23 ft (7.0 m)

Population (2020)
  - Total: 3,333
  - Density: 527.2/sq mi (203.54/km^{2})
- Time zone: UTC-6 (CST)
  - Summer (DST): UTC-5 (CDT)
- ZIP code: 70591
- Area code: 337
- FIPS code: 22-80430
- Website: http://www.townofwelsh.com/

Welsh is a town in Jefferson Davis Parish, Louisiana. As of the 2020 census, Welsh had a population of 3,333. It is part of the Jennings Micropolitan Statistical Area.

== History ==
Welsh was originally a homestead owned by Miles Welsh, a Pennsylvania man who went to Louisiana to seek a warmer climate for his health. He died in 1868, but his son Henry built a cabin on the current-day town site. The home sat along the main stagecoach route across south Louisiana, and Welsh's home and store was the primary stop for travelers between New Iberia and Texas. In 1880, Welsh donated right-of-way to the Louisiana Western Rail Road (later Southern Pacific), which built a station. The town of Welsh was platted in 1880 and incorporated on March 15, 1888, with Henry Welsh elected its first mayor a few months before his death that October. Initially part of the old Imperial Calcasieu Parish, in 1913 Welsh became part of the newly established Jefferson Davis Parish.

== Geography ==
Welsh is located at 30°14′15″N 92°49′14″W (30.237419, -92.820593).

According to the United States Census Bureau, the town has a total area of 6.3 square miles (16.4 km^{2}), of which 6.2 square miles (16.1 km^{2}) is land and 0.1 square mile (0.3 km^{2}) (1.89%) is water.

== Demographics ==
Historical population
Census	Pop.	Note	%±
1890	200		—
1900	320		60.0%
1910	1,250		290.6%
1920	1,456		16.5%
1930	1,514		4.0%
1940	1,822		20.3%
1950	2,416		32.6%
1960	3,332		37.9%
1970	3,203		−3.9%
1980	3,515		9.7%
1990	3,299		−6.1%
2000	3,380		2.5%
2010	3,226		−4.6%
2020	3,333		3.3%
2025 (est.)	3,286	▼	−1.4%
U.S. Decennial Census

=== 2020 census ===
As of the 2020 census, Welsh had a population of 3,333. The median age was 38.8 years. 26.0% of residents were under the age of 18 and 18.5% were 65 years of age or older. For every 100 females there were 86.8 males, and for every 100 females age 18 and over there were 83.1 males age 18 and over.

0.0% of residents lived in urban areas, while 100.0% lived in rural areas.

There were 1,269 households in Welsh, of which 34.7% had children under the age of 18 living in them. Of all households, 40.8% were married-couple households, 17.1% were households with a male householder and no spouse or partner present, and 35.0% were households with a female householder and no spouse or partner present. About 27.3% of all households were made up of individuals and 13.0% had someone living alone who was 65 years of age or older.

There were 1,452 housing units, of which 12.6% were vacant. The homeowner vacancy rate was 1.9% and the rental vacancy rate was 7.4%.

Welsh racial composition as of 2020
Race	Number	Percentage
White (non-Hispanic)	2,429	72.88%
Black or African American (non-Hispanic)	661	19.83%
Native American	4	0.12%
Asian	8	0.24%
Other/Mixed	168	5.04%
Hispanic or Latino	63	1.89%

== Notable people ==
- Canray Fontenot (1922–1995), Creole fiddler
- Lance Guidry (born 1971), American football coach, former defensive coordinator for the University of Miami
- Phillip Walker (1937–2010), electric blues guitarist and singer
- Charles Mann, swamp pop legend and member of the Louisiana Music Hall of Fame
- Milton Vanicor (master fiddler/musician) Inducted in the Cajun French Music Hall of Fame in 2006

== Education ==
Jefferson Davis Parish Public Schools operates public schools in Welsh. Schools serving Welsh include Welsh Elementary School (PK–5) in Welsh, Welsh - Roanoke Jr. High (6–8) in nearby Roanoke, and Welsh High School (9–12) in Welsh.

Jefferson Davis Parish Library operates the McBurney Memorial Branch at 301 South Sarah Street.

== See also ==
- AeroLites: based in Welsh
