= June James (gridiron football) =

American football player (1962–1990)

- James with the Saskatchewan Roughriders

No. 96, 58, 48
- Position: Linebacker

Personal information
- Born: December 2, 1962; Jennings, Louisiana, U.S.
- Died: May 8, 1990 (aged 27); Gonzales, Louisiana, U.S.
- Listed height: 6 ft 1 in (1.85 m)
- Listed weight: 218 lb (99 kg)

Career information
- High school: Southeast (Kansas City, Missouri)
- College: Texas
- NFL draft: 1985: 9th round, 230th overall pick

Career history
- Detroit Lions (1985); Indianapolis Colts (1987); Saskatchewan Roughriders (1988)

Career NFL statistics
- Fumble recoveries: 1
- Stats at Pro Football Reference

June James IV (December 2, 1962 – May 8, 1990) was an American professional football linebacker who played two seasons in the National Football League (NFL) with the Detroit Lions and Indianapolis Colts. He was selected by the Lions in the ninth round of the 1985 NFL draft after playing college football for the Texas Longhorns. He also played for the Saskatchewan Roughriders of the Canadian Football League.

== Early life and college ==
June James IV was born on December 2, 1962, in Jennings, Louisiana. His family moved to Kansas City, Missouri in 1966. He attended Southeast High School in Kansas City.

James played college football for the Texas Longhorns of the University of Texas at Austin, where he was an All-Southwest Conference linebacker. He graduated with a bachelor's degree in business. He played in the East-West Shrine Game.

== Professional career ==
James was selected by the Detroit Lions in the ninth round, with the 230th overall pick, of the 1985 NFL draft. He officially signed with the team on July 21. He played in all 16 games for the Lions during his rookie year in 1985 and recovered one fumble. James was released by the Lions on August 18, 1986.

James signed with the Indianapolis Colts on May 11, 1987. He played in 11 games for the Colts during the strike-shortened 1987 season. He was released on August 29, 1988.

James was signed to the practice roster of the Saskatchewan Roughriders of the Canadian Football League on September 1, 1988. He was later promoted to the active roster and dressed in four games for the Roughriders during the 1988 season, recording one sack and one fumble recovery. He suffered a torn ACL in 1989 and was then released by the Roughriders on June 10, 1989.

== Personal life ==
James moved to Baton Rouge, Louisiana in 1988. He had a son named June James V.

James died on May 8, 1990, in Gonzales, Louisiana at the age of 27 when his car went off the road for unknown reasons. He was working as a car salesman at the time of his death.
