= Monte Ledbetter =

American football player (born 1943)

No. 86, 43
- Position: Wide receiver

Personal information
- Born: August 13, 1943 (age 83); Jennings, Louisiana, U.S.
- Listed height: 6 ft 2 in (1.88 m)
- Listed weight: 185 lb (84 kg)

Career information
- High school: Roanoke (Roanoke, Louisiana)
- College: Northwestern State (LA) (1964–1965)
- NFL draft: 1966: 10th round, 153rd overall pick
- AFL draft: 1966: 11th round, 95th overall pick

Career history
- Cleveland Browns (1966)*; Houston Oilers (1966–1967); Buffalo Bills (1967–1969); Atlanta Falcons (1969); Jacksonville Sharks (1974)*
- * Offseason or practice squad member only

Career NFL/AFL statistics
- Receptions: 18
- Receiving yards: 314
- Touchdowns: 3
- Stats at Pro Football Reference

Monte Richards Ledbetter (born August 13, 1943) is an American former professional football player who was a wide receiver in the American Football League (AFL) and National Football League (NFL). He played college football for the Northwestern State Demons.

== Early life ==
Monte Richards Ledbetter was born on August 13, 1943, in Jennings, Louisiana. He attended Roanoke High School in Roanoke, Louisiana. He did not play football in high school.

== College career ==
Ledbetter participated in track and field at Northwestern State College of Louisiana. He set school freshman records in four events and also broke school records in the 100-yard dash, broad jump, and triple jump. In 1964, he set the Gulf States Conference broad jump record.

Ledbetter first played college football for the Northwestern State Demons in 1964. He was a two-year letterman from 1964 to 1965. He was inducted into the school's athletics hall of fame in 1982.

== Professional career ==
Ledbetter was selected by the Houston Oilers in the 11th round, with the 95th overall pick, of the 1966 AFL draft and by the Cleveland Browns in the 10th round, with the 153rd overall pick, of the 1966 NFL draft. He decided to sign with the Browns but was later released. He then signed with the Oilers and spent the 1966 season on the team's taxi squad. Ledbetter played in five games, starting three, for the Oilers during the 1967 season, catching four passes for 43 yards and one touchdown. He was waived by the Oilers on October 27, 1967.

Ledbetter was claimed off waivers by the Buffalo Bills on October 30, 1967. He appeared in five games, starting three, for the Bills in 1967, recording nine receptions for 161 yards and one touchdown. He played in seven games during the 1968 season, catching four passes for 94 yards and one touchdown. Ledbetter appeared in two games for the Bills in 1969 before being released.

Ledbetter was then signed to the taxi squad of the NFL's Atlanta Falcons on October 16, 1969. He was promoted to the active roster on November 1, 1969. He played in two games for the Falcons that year and caught one pass for 16 yards. Ledbetter was released in 1970.

He signed with the Jacksonville Sharks of the World Football League in 1974 but was later released.
