= Travis Etienne =

American football player (born 1999)

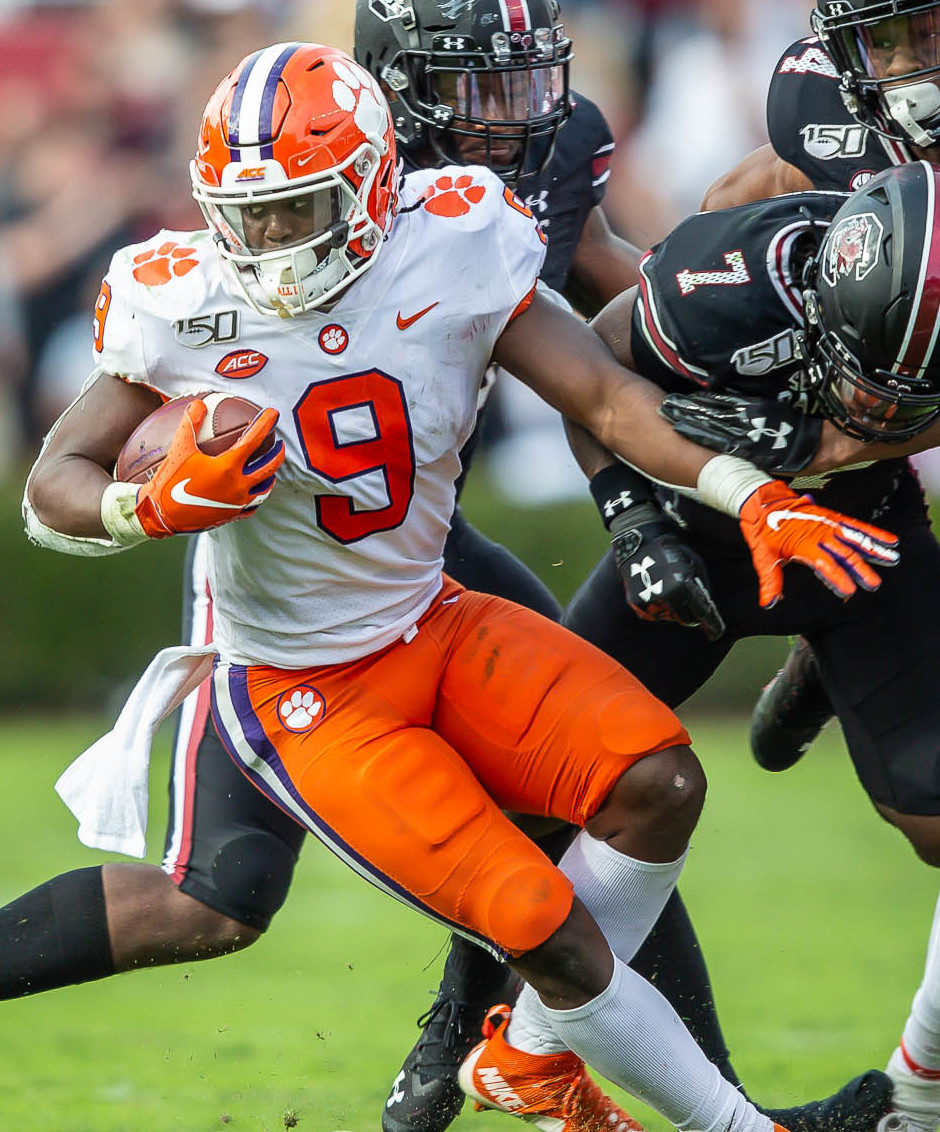
- Etienne with the Clemson Tigers in 2019

No. 3 – New Orleans Saints
- Position: Running back
- Roster status: Active

Personal information
- Born: January 26, 1999 (age 27); Jennings, Louisiana, U.S.
- Listed height: 5 ft 10 in (1.78 m)
- Listed weight: 215 lb (98 kg)

Career information
- High school: Jennings
- College: Clemson (2017–2020)
- NFL draft: 2021: 1st round, 25th overall pick

Career history
- Jacksonville Jaguars (2021–2025); New Orleans Saints (2026–present)

Awards and highlights
- CFP national champion (2018); Consensus All-American (2020); First-team All-American (2018); Second-team All-American (2019); 2× ACC Player of the Year (2018, 2019); 2× ACC Offensive Player of the Year (2018, 2019); NCAA rushing touchdowns leader (2018); NCAA scoring leader (2018); 3× First-team All-ACC (2018–2020); Third-team All-ACC (2017)

Career NFL statistics as of Week 10, 2026
- Rushing yards: 3,940
- Rushing average: 4.2
- Rushing touchdowns: 25
- Receptions: 182
- Receiving yards: 1,409
- Receiving touchdowns: 7
- Stats at Pro Football Reference

Travis Etienne Jr. (US: /ˈeɪtʃæn/ AY-chan; born January 26, 1999) is an American professional football running back for the New Orleans Saints of the National Football League (NFL). He played college football for the Clemson Tigers and was selected by the Jacksonville Jaguars in the first round 25th pick of the 2021 NFL draft.

== Early life ==
Etienne was raised in Jennings, Louisiana, and is of Louisiana Creole ancestry. His father works for a well service company in the oil industry, while his mother, Donnetta, is a nurse.

Etienne attended Jennings High School in Jennings, Louisiana. As a senior, he rushed for 2,459 yards with 39 touchdowns. For his career, he had 8,864 total yards with 115 total touchdowns. He was rated as a four-star recruit and the 15th highest-rated running back recruit in the country by the 247Sports.com Composite, which aggregates the ratings of the major recruiting services. Etienne committed to Clemson University to play college football on January 21, 2017.

== College career ==
=== 2017 season ===
As a freshman at Clemson in 2017, he was part of a backfield that contained Tavien Feaster, Adam Choice, C. J. Fuller, and dual-threat quarterback Kelly Bryant. He led the team in rushing with 766 yards on 107 carries with 13 touchdowns.

=== 2018 season ===
As a sophomore in 2018, he was a key member of a Clemson team that won the national championship. Etienne rushed for 1,659 yards on the year and had an FBS-leading 24 rushing touchdowns. He had an additional two receiving touchdowns, bringing his total touchdowns from scrimmage to 26, which also led FBS. He had eight games going over 100 rushing yards After winning the 2018 ACC Championship Game against Pitt, Etienne was named the MVP of the game. Etienne was named ACC Player of the Year and ACC Offensive Player of the Year following the regular season. He was named a first-team All-American by Sporting News and ESPN, and was a consensus second-team All-American.

=== 2019 season ===
Etienne started his junior year at Clemson with a career-high 205 yards and three touchdowns in the first game of the season. He bested this in a November 2 game against Wofford, when he ran for 212 yards and two touchdowns on just 9 attempts (23.6 yards per attempt). He became the first Clemson running back to have three career 200-yard games. At the conclusion of the regular season, Etienne was named ACC Player of the Year, ACC Offensive Player of the Year, and first-team All-ACC; all for the second consecutive year. He is the first Clemson player to win consecutive ACC Player of the Year awards since Steve Fuller in 1977–78. Etienne ended his junior season with 1,614 rushing yards and an ACC-leading 19 rushing touchdowns. His 7.8 yards-per-carry were second most in FBS. In the Fiesta Bowl, he caught the game winning touchdown with 1:49 left in the game, running it in from 34 yards. Following the season, he was named a consensus second-team All-American.

Despite projections that Etienne would enter the 2020 NFL draft, he announced on January 17, 2020, that he would return to Clemson for his senior year.

=== 2020 season ===
On October 31, 2020, in a 34–28 win over Boston College, Etienne finished with two touchdowns and a career-high 264 all-purpose yards. With the performance, he scored a touchdown in 42 games, breaking Donnel Pumphrey's record for most in FBS history. He finished his career with touchdowns scored in 46 games. With his 4,952 career rushing yards Etienne also broke the ACC career rushing record previously held by Ted Brown. He also set ACC career records for rushing touchdowns (70), total touchdowns (78), and total points scored (468). He scored at least one touchdown in 46 of 55 career games, setting the FBS and NCAA records. He was named as a Consensus All-American.

== Professional career ==
Pre-draft measurables
Height	Weight	Arm length	Hand span	Wingspan	40-yard dash	10-yard split	20-yard split	Vertical jump	Broad jump	Bench press
5 ft 10 1/8 in (1.78 m)	215 lb (98 kg)	30 1/8 in (0.77 m)	9 3/8 in (0.24 m)	6 ft 1 1/8 in (1.86 m)	4.45 s	1.56 s	2.50 s	33.5 in (0.85 m)	10 ft 8 in (3.25 m)	18 reps
All values from Pro Day

=== Jacksonville Jaguars ===
==== 2021 season ====
Etienne officially declared for the 2021 NFL draft in January 2021. He was selected by the Jacksonville Jaguars with the 25th overall selection, which they previously obtained from a trade that sent Jalen Ramsey to the Los Angeles Rams. This reunited Etienne with his college quarterback Trevor Lawrence, who was taken by the Jaguars first overall in the same draft. On May 15, Jaguars coach Urban Meyer announced that Etienne would spend the Jaguars minicamp as a wide receiver, rather than a running back. On July 19, 2021, Etienne signed his four-year rookie contract with the Jaguars, worth $12.9 million.

During the Jaguars second preseason game against the New Orleans Saints, Etienne suffered a Lisfranc injury and was subsequently ruled out indefinitely. It was later revealed that Etienne had suffered a significant tear in the lisfranc zone of his foot, which required surgery, and prematurely ended his 2021 season. He was placed on season-ending injured reserve later in the day.

==== 2022 season ====
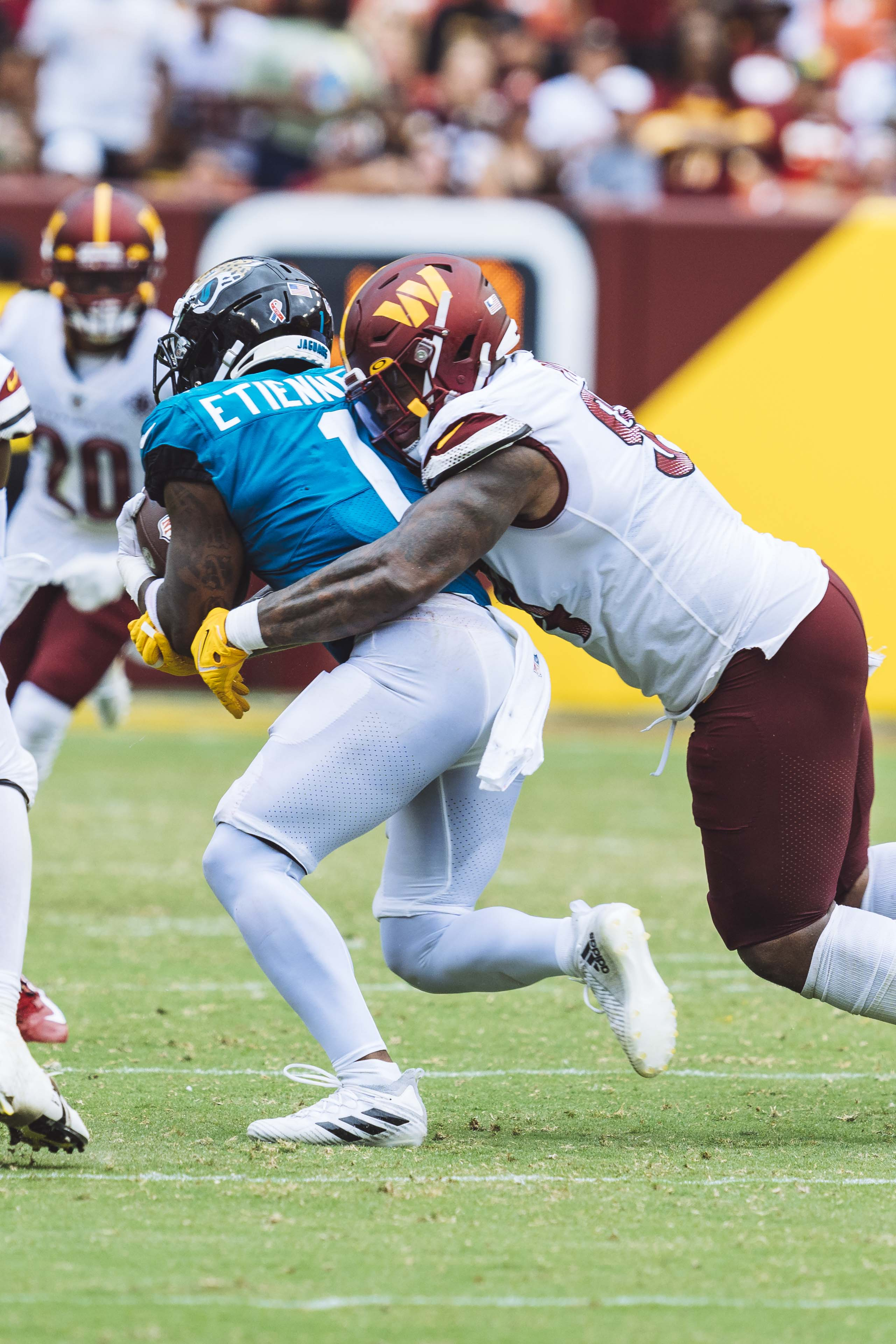
Etienne playing for the Jacksonville Jaguars in 2022

Etienne made his professional debut in the Jaguars' 2022 season opener against the Washington Commanders and had four carries for 47 rushing yards.

Etienne recorded his first career touchdown in Week 7 against the New York Giants, adding 14 carries for 114 yards and 1 lost fumble in the 23–17 loss. This marked the first time in his NFL career that he recorded a touchdown and over 100 yards in an NFL game. After a trade with the New York Jets involving Jaguars running back James Robinson, Etienne was named the starting running back in Jacksonville. In the following game, he recorded 24 carries for 156 rushing yards and one rushing touchdown in the 21–17 loss to the Denver Broncos. He had 28 carries for 109 rushing yards and two rushing touchdowns in the next game against the Las Vegas Raiders, a 27–20 victory. He had two more games over the 100-yard mark on the season, in Week 15 against the Dallas Cowboys and Week 17 against the Houston Texans.

Etienne finished the 2022 season with 220 carries for 1,125 rushing yards and five rushing touchdowns to go along with 35 receptions for 316 receiving yards. In the Wild Card Round against the Los Angeles Chargers, he had 20 carries for 109 rushing yards in the 31–30 victory. On the Jaguars' final drive, Etienne had a 25-yard run on fourth down to set up the game-winning field goal attempt.

==== 2023 season ====
During Week 5 against the Buffalo Bills at Tottenham Hotspur Stadium, Etienne finished with 136 rushing yards and two touchdowns as the Jaguars won 25–20. He finished the season with 267 carries for 1,008 rushing yards and 11 touchdowns.

==== 2024 season ====
On April 29, 2024, the Jaguars picked up the fifth-year option on Etienne's contract. He finished the 2024 season with 150 carries for 558 rushing yards and two rushing touchdowns to go with 39 receptions for 254 receiving yards.

==== 2025 season ====
In the season opener, Etienne had 16 carries for 143 yards in a 26–10 win over the Carolina Panthers. He had 19 carries for 124 yards and a touchdown in a 26–21 win over the 49ers in Week 6. In Week 15, against the Jets, he had three receiving touchdowns in the 48–20 win. Etienne bounced back in the 2025 season, finishing the year with 1,107 rushing yards and seven rushing touchdowns on 260 carries. He also set a career high in receiving touchdowns with six. He had a receiving touchdown to go with 116 scrimmage yards in the 27–24 loss to the Bills in the Wild Card Round.

=== New Orleans Saints ===
On March 13, 2026, Etienne signed a four-year, $52 million contract with the New Orleans Saints.

== Career statistics ==
Legend
	Led the league
**Bold**	Career high

=== NFL ===
==== Regular season ====
Year	Team	Games		Rushing					Receiving					Fumbles	
Year	Team	GP	GS	Att	Yds	Avg	Lng	TD	Rec	Yds	Avg	Lng	TD	Fum	Lost
2021	JAX	0	0	Did not play due to injury											
2022	JAX	17	12	220	**1,125**	**5.1**	62	5	35	316	**9.0**	30	0	**5**	**3**
2023	JAX	17	17	**267**	1,008	3.8	62	**11**	**58**	**476**	8.2	**56**	1	0	0
2024	JAX	15	15	150	558	3.7	22	2	39	254	6.5	26	0	1	1
2025	JAX	17	16	260	1,107	4.3	**71**	7	36	292	8.1	45	**6**	1	0
2026	NOR	4	4	38	142	3.7	18	0	14	71	5.1	16	0	0	0
Career		70	64	935	3,940	4.2	71	25	182	1,409	7.7	56	7	7	4

==== Postseason ====
Year	Team	Games		Rushing					Receiving					Fumbles	
Year	Team	GP	GS	Att	Yds	Avg	Lng	TD	Rec	Yds	Avg	Lng	TD	Fum	Lost
2022	JAX	2	2	**30**	**171**	5.7	25	**1**	4	30	7.5	12	0	0	0
2025	JAX	1	1	10	67	**6.7**	**26**	0	**5**	**49**	**9.8**	**14**	**1**	0	0
Career		3	3	40	238	6.0	26	1	9	79	8.8	14	1	0	0

=== College ===
Legend
Led the NCAA

Season	Team	GP	Rushing						Receiving		
Season	Team	GP	Att	Yds	Avg	Lng	TD	Y/G	Rec	Yds	TD
2017	Clemson	13	107	766	7.2	81	13	63.8	5	57	0
2018	Clemson	15	204	**1,658**	**8.1**	75	**24**	**110.5**	12	78	2
2019	Clemson	15	**207**	1,615	7.8	**90**	19	107.7	37	432	**4**
2020	Clemson	12	168	914	5.4	72	14	76.1	**48**	**588**	2
Career		55	686	4,952	7.2	90	70	90.0	102	1,155	8

== Personal life ==
Through the 2025 season, Etienne's surname was believed to be pronounced /i.ti.ˈɛn/ (ee-tee-EN). Upon signing with the Saints and returning to his home state of Louisiana, he informed the media during his introductory press conference that it is actually pronounced /ˈeɪ.tʃæn/ (AY-chan).

Travis has a younger brother Trevor who was drafted by the Carolina Panthers with the 114th pick in the 2025 NFL draft.
