= Guy Sockrider =

American politician

Member of the Louisiana State Senate
- In office 1948–1964
- Succeeded by: James O. Dolby

Personal details
- Born: Guy William Sockrider Jr. November 5, 1921 Jennings, Louisiana, U.S.
- Died: February 25, 2011 (aged 89) Lake Charles, Louisiana, U.S.
- Party: Democratic
- Spouse: Ruth Grien (m. 1941; died. 1964)

Guy William Sockrider Jr. (November 5, 1921 – February 25, 2011) was an American politician. A member of the Democratic Party, he served in the Louisiana State Senate from 1948 to 1964.

== Life and career ==
Sockrider was born in Jennings, Louisiana, the son of Guy William Sockrider Sr and Myrtle Clarke He attended Jennings High School, graduating in 1938. After graduating, he volunteered for the United States Army in 1942. During his military service, he served as a captain in the 89th Infantry Division and the United States Army Reserve.

Sockrider served in the Louisiana State Senate from 1948 to 1964. During his service in the Senate, he was co-author of legislation establishing the W. O. Moss Regional Hospital and upgrading McNeese State University to university status, and in 1949, he established the Industrial Construction Company.

== Death ==
Sockrider died on February 25, 2011 in Lake Charles, Louisiana, at the age of 89. He was buried in Prien Memorial Park.
