= Jennings, Louisiana =

- City
- City of Jennings
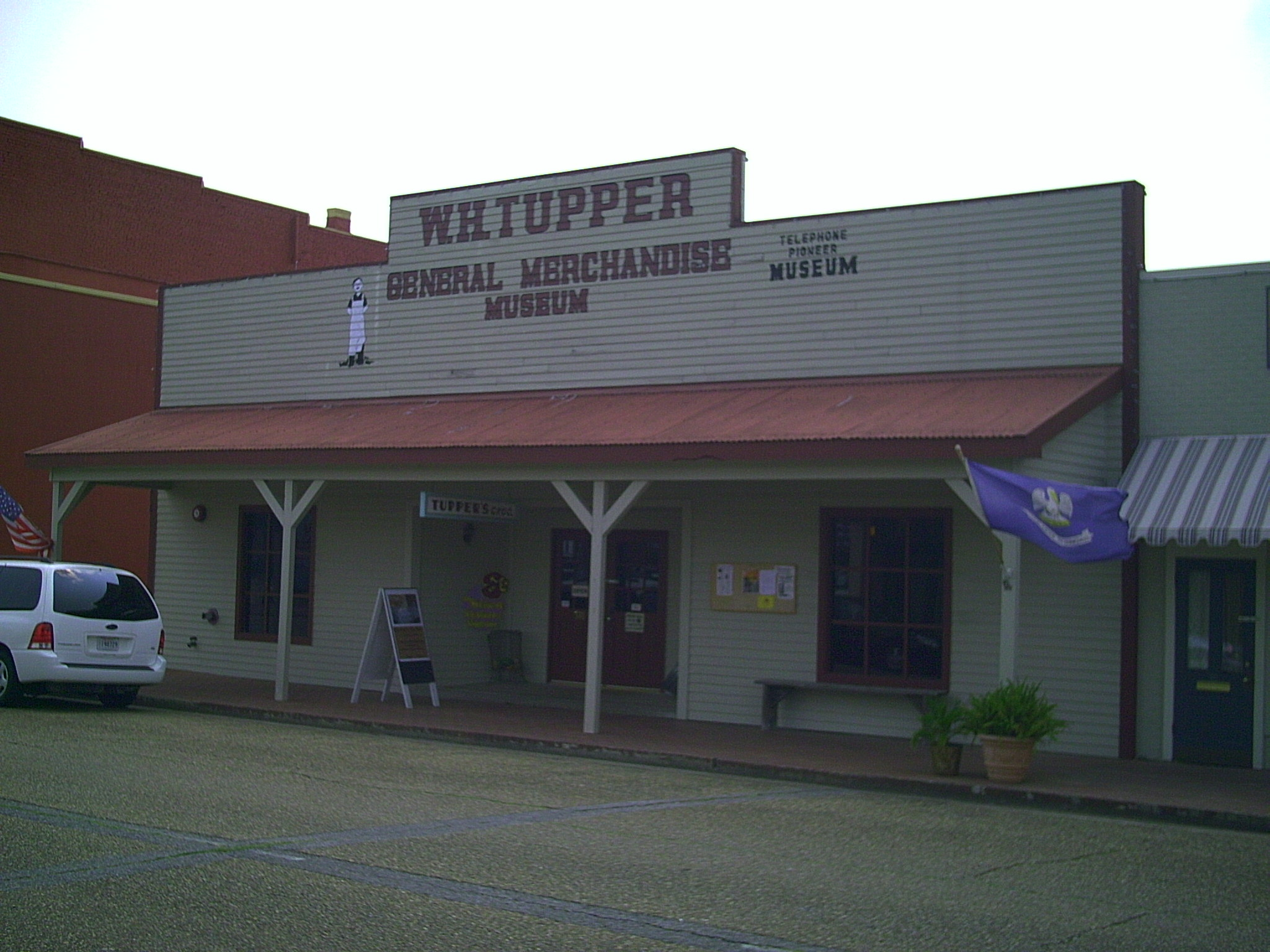
- The front facade of the W. H. Tupper General Merchandise Museum, circa 2008
- Motto: "Cradle of Louisiana Oil"
- Location of Jennings in Jefferson Davis Parish, Louisiana.

- Location of Louisiana in the United States
- Coordinates: 30°13′20″N 92°39′25″W
- Country: United States
- State: Louisiana
- Parish: Jefferson Davis
- Founded: May 2, 1888

Area
  - Total: 10.58 sq mi (27.40 km^{2})
  - Land: 10.56 sq mi (27.35 km^{2})
  - Water: 0.019 sq mi (0.05 km^{2})
- Elevation: 26 ft (7.9 m)

Population (2020)
  - Total: 9,837
  - Density: 931.5/sq mi (359.67/km^{2})
- Time zone: UTC-6 (CST)
  - Summer (DST): UTC-5 (CDT)
- ZIP code: 70546
- Area code: 337
- FIPS code: 22-38355
- Website: City of Jennings, Louisiana

Jennings is a city in and the parish seat of Jefferson Davis Parish, Louisiana, United States, near Lake Charles. As of the 2020 census, Jennings had a population of 9,837.

Jennings is the principal city of the Jennings Micropolitan Statistical Area, which includes all of Jefferson Davis Parish. It is also part of the larger Lake Charles-Jennings Combined Statistical Area. It is also part of the large, 22-parish Acadiana region of the state, with a large Francophone population, many descended from early Acadian settlers.

== History ==
Jennings McComb, the town's namesake, was an Irish contractor for the Southern Pacific Railroad. He built the Jennings depot on a divide peculiar to the southwest Louisiana. This became the center of new development based on the railroad. The first settler was recorded as A. D. McFarlain, who came in 1881 from St. Mary Parish and opened a store. McFarlain also became the first rice grower, postmaster, brickmaker, and builder in the community. Prospering with Jennings’ growth, McFarlain was considered one of the town's prominent businessmen and civic leaders.

The Jennings area attracted numerous wheat farmers from Iowa, Kansas, Nebraska, and other Midwestern states. The new settlers of southwest Louisiana were referred to as "Yankees" by the natives, who were of Acadian French and African-American descent. They had settled along the waterways in the parish, which they had relied on for transportation before the railroad. They fished in the bayous. The Cajuns gave appreciable aid to the settlers in homesteading and homemaking. The people grew rice, cotton, sweet potatoes, and corn.

Sylvester L. Cary reached this area on February 7, 1883, from Iowa. He became known as the town's "father," as he persuaded other Iowans to relocate there. He said he was "seeking a home where there was neither winter nor mortgages." So impressed was Cary by the fertile country around the Jennings depot that he shared his findings with others. He attracted fellow Midwesterners to southwest Louisiana by writing to friends in Iowa, extolling the area. When he returned to Iowa to pack up his family for the move to Jennings, he persuaded several neighbors preparing to migrate west, to follow him to Jennings and southwest Louisiana.

Much of southwest Louisiana was developed by the North American Land and Timber Co., which owned large portions of land. Seaman A. Knapp, president of the Iowa State College of Agriculture, was engaged in 1885 to demonstrate the region's suitability for rice production. Knapp attracted a number of Iowans to settle the area. The land company placed advertisements in newspapers published in the Midwestern states.

On May 2, 1888, the settlement of Jennings was incorporated as a village. In 1901, a fire destroyed a large portion of the wooden structures in Jennings.

That same year, Jennings was the site of the first oil well to produce in Louisiana, revealing its first oil field. Oil brought a boom to the town for a period. When oil production declined, the basic agricultural economy of the parish supported the town.

== Geography ==
Jennings is located at 30°13′20″N 92°39′25″W (30.222207, -92.656880) and has an elevation of 26 feet (7.9 m).

According to the United States Census Bureau, the city has a total area of 10.3 square miles (27 km^{2}), of which 10.2 square miles (26 km^{2}) is land and 0.04 square miles (0.10 km^{2}) (0.19%) is water.

== Climate ==
The climate in this area is characterized by hot, humid summers and generally mild to cool winters. According to the Köppen Climate Classification system, Jennings has a humid subtropical climate, abbreviated "Cfa" on climate maps.

Climate data for Jennings, Louisiana (1991–2020 normals, extremes 1897–present)
Month	Jan	Feb	Mar	Apr	May	Jun	Jul	Aug	Sep	Oct	Nov	Dec	Year
Record high °F (°C)	83 (28)	87 (31)	92 (33)	97 (36)	100 (38)	104 (40)	105 (41)	107 (42)	107 (42)	98 (37)	95 (35)	89 (32)	107 (42)
Mean maximum °F (°C)	75.0 (23.9)	76.9 (24.9)	81.4 (27.4)	85.2 (29.6)	90.4 (32.4)	94.3 (34.6)	95.3 (35.2)	96.7 (35.9)	94.4 (34.7)	89.6 (32.0)	82.9 (28.3)	77.5 (25.3)	97.7 (36.5)
Mean daily maximum °F (°C)	60.1 (15.6)	63.9 (17.7)	70.7 (21.5)	77.1 (25.1)	83.7 (28.7)	88.5 (31.4)	90.2 (32.3)	91.0 (32.8)	87.7 (30.9)	80.4 (26.9)	70.2 (21.2)	62.5 (16.9)	77.2 (25.1)
Daily mean °F (°C)	50.9 (10.5)	54.5 (12.5)	61.1 (16.2)	67.5 (19.7)	74.8 (23.8)	80.3 (26.8)	81.9 (27.7)	82.1 (27.8)	78.3 (25.7)	69.5 (20.8)	59.7 (15.4)	53.1 (11.7)	67.8 (19.9)
Mean daily minimum °F (°C)	41.6 (5.3)	45.1 (7.3)	51.5 (10.8)	57.8 (14.3)	65.9 (18.8)	72.0 (22.2)	73.7 (23.2)	73.2 (22.9)	69.0 (20.6)	58.7 (14.8)	49.2 (9.6)	43.6 (6.4)	58.4 (14.7)
Mean minimum °F (°C)	26.3 (−3.2)	30.9 (−0.6)	35.0 (1.7)	43.1 (6.2)	54.0 (12.2)	65.3 (18.5)	68.8 (20.4)	68.2 (20.1)	56.9 (13.8)	43.0 (6.1)	33.5 (0.8)	29.7 (−1.3)	24.6 (−4.1)
Record low °F (°C)	7 (−14)	9 (−13)	20 (−7)	32 (0)	39 (4)	46 (8)	59 (15)	59 (15)	43 (6)	27 (−3)	22 (−6)	10 (−12)	7 (−14)
Average precipitation inches (mm)	6.29 (160)	4.25 (108)	3.77 (96)	4.79 (122)	5.52 (140)	6.61 (168)	5.36 (136)	6.80 (173)	5.80 (147)	4.73 (120)	4.85 (123)	4.74 (120)	63.51 (1,613)
Average snowfall inches (cm)	0.0 (0.0)	0.0 (0.0)	0.0 (0.0)	0.0 (0.0)	0.0 (0.0)	0.0 (0.0)	0.0 (0.0)	0.0 (0.0)	0.0 (0.0)	0.0 (0.0)	0.0 (0.0)	0.1 (0.25)	0.1 (0.25)
Average precipitation days (≥ 0.01 in)	11.6	10.2	8.9	7.8	8.0	12.2	14.2	12.8	9.8	7.8	8.9	11.3	123.5
Average snowy days (≥ 0.1 in)	0.0	0.0	0.0	0.0	0.0	0.0	0.0	0.0	0.0	0.0	0.0	0.1	0.1
Source: NOAA

== Demographics ==
Historical population
Census	Pop.	Note	%±
1890	412		—
1900	1,539		273.5%
1910	3,925		155.0%
1920	3,824		−2.6%
1930	4,036		5.5%
1940	7,343		81.9%
1950	9,663		31.6%
1960	11,887		23.0%
1970	11,783		−0.9%
1980	12,401		5.2%
1990	11,305		−8.8%
2000	10,986		−2.8%
2010	10,383		−5.5%
2020	9,837		−5.3%
2025 (est.)	9,235	▼	−6.1%
U.S. Decennial Census

Jennings racial composition as of 2020
Race	Number	Percentage
White (non-Hispanic)	6,364	64.69%
Black or African American (non-Hispanic)	2,782	28.28%
Native American	31	0.32%
Asian	30	0.3%
Pacific Islander	3	0.03%
Other/Mixed	387	3.93%
Hispanic or Latino	240	2.44%

As of the 2020 United States census, there were 9,837 people, 3,862 households, and 2,390 families residing in the city.

== Notable people ==
- A.C. Clemons (1921–1992), served in the Louisiana State Senate
- Chancy Croft (1937–2022) Born in Jennings. Moved to Odessa, Texas, then Anchorage, Alaska. President of the Alaska Senate (1975–1977), Democratic Party nominee for Alaska governor (1978), President of the University of Alaska Board of Regents (2001–2002).
- Avalon Daggett (1907–2002), filmmaker
- Travis Etienne (born 1999), American football running back for the Jacksonville Jaguars.
- Trevor Etienne (born 2004), American football running back for the Georgia Bulldogs.
- Cleve Francis (born 1945), Country music artist, released three albums in the early 1990s.
- John E. Guinn (1952–2024), former member of the Louisiana House of Representatives from Jennings
- Eugene John Hebert (1923–1990), Society of Jesus Roman Catholic priest who disappeared in Sri Lanka
- W. Scott Heywood (1872–1950), member of the Louisiana State Senate from 1932–1936, author of homestead exemption; discovered oil in Jeff Davis Parish in 1901
- June James (1962–1990), NFL player
- Edith Killgore Kirkpatrick (1918–2014), member of Louisiana Board of Regents, 1978–1990; music educator; Baptist state official
- Monte Ledbetter (born 1943), American football player
- Pat Rapp (born 1967), Former MLB player (San Francisco Giants, Florida Marlins, Kansas City Royals, Boston Red Sox, Baltimore Orioles, Anaheim Angels)
- Guy Sockrider (1921–2011), member of the Louisiana State Senate from Jennings from 1948 to 1964; industrialist in Jennings and later Lake Charles
- Donald Ellsworth Walter (born 1936), U.S. District Judge for the United States District Court for the Western District of Louisiana, based in Shreveport; U.S. attorney from 1969 to 1977, born in Jennings in 1936

== Education ==
Jefferson Davis Parish Public Schools operates public schools serving Jennings. The schools serving Jennings, all within the city, include Jennings Elementary School (pk-6), and Jennings High School (7-12) .

Bethel Christian School is a PreK-12 Christian school located in unincorporated Jefferson Davis Parish, near Jennings.

Jefferson Davis Parish Library operates the Headquarters Branch at 118 West Plaquemine Street in Jennings. In addition the City of Jennings operates the Jennings Carnegie Public Library at 303 North Cary Avenue.

Our Lady Immaculate (OLI) is a Catholic school serving grades PREK-8.
