= Funke (disambiguation) =

Funke is a surname of German origin.

Funke may also refer to:

- Funke Digital TV, Dutch antenna manufacturer
- Funke Mediengruppe, a German newspaper and media publisher group
- 5712 Funke, an asteroid
- Johnson-Funke monoplane, 1940s United States experimental twin-engine aircraft

== See also ==
- Funcke
- Funk (disambiguation)
