= Funk (disambiguation) =

Funk is a genre of music.

Funk or Funky may also refer to:

== Places ==
- Funk, Nebraska, United States, a village
- Funk, Ohio, United States, an unincorporated community
- Funk Glacier, Graham Land, Antarctica
- Funk House (disambiguation), various houses on US National Register of Historic Places
- Funk Island, Newfoundland, Canada

== People ==
- Funk (surname), a family name (including a list of people)
- DJ Funk (1971–2025), American DJ
- Funky (artist) (born 1974), Puerto Rican rapper and songwriter

== Aircraft ==
- Funk B, a 1930s aircraft made by the Funk Aircraft Company
- Funk F-23, a 1960s agricultural aircraft

== Arts, entertainment, and media ==
=== Music ===
- Funk (album), 2002, by Bulldog Mansion
- "F.U.N.K.", a 2007 song by Prince
- "Funk", a 2020 song by Meghan Trainor from her album Treat Myself
- "Funk #49", 1970 song by James Gang
- Funky (The Spencer Davis Group album)
- Funky (Gene Ammons album), 1957
- "Funky" (The Chambers Brothers song), 1971
- "Funky", a song by Moka Only and Psy from the album Lowdown Suite 2… The Box, 2009

=== Other uses in arts, entertainment, and media ===
- "Funk" (Glee), a TV series episode
- Funk (service), a public streaming service in Germany
- Funk art, a figurative art movement from the 1950s and 1960s
- Funk carioca, music genre known as funk in Brazil
- Funk melody, a fusion genre of funk carioca and Latin freestyle
- Funk ostentação, a music style created in São Paulo, Brazil
- Funk ousadia, an erotic subgenre of Brazilian funk
- Funky Winkerbean, an American comic strip

== Other uses ==
- Funk, a temporary depressive episode
- FUNK, Front Uni National du Kampuchéa or National United Front of Kampuchea, a coalition of Sihanoukists and the Khmer Rouge
- Funk & Wagnalls, a New York City publisher

== See also ==
- Depression, "funk" can mean "a depressed mood" (Webster's NWD 1979)
- Panic, "funk" can mean "cowering through fear"; "panic" (Webster's NWD 1979)
- Fun 9, a 1999 album by Takako Minekawa, pronounced funk when 9 is spoken in Japanese
- Funck, a surname
- Funcke, a surname
- Funke, a surname
- Phonk, a subgenre of hip hop and trap music
