= Funke =

Funke is a family name of German origin. Funke means "spark" and refers to the work of a smith. People with this surname include:

- Alex Funke (b. 1944), American photographer
- Annie Funke (b. 1985), American actress
- Arno Funke (b. 1950), German author and extortionist
- Cornelia Funke (b. 1958), German children's author
- Daniel Funke (b. 1981), German journalist
- Ernst Funke (1835–1906), American politician and businessman
- Fabian Funke (born 1997), German politician
- Felix Funke (1865–1932), German admiral
- Helene Funke (1869–1957), German painter
- Jakob Funke (1901-1975), German journalist and publisher
- Jan-Lukas Funke (b. 1999), German footballer
- Jaromír Funke (1896–1945), Czech photographer
- Jeffrey J. Funke (b. 1969), American judge
- Karl-Heinz Funke (b. 1942), German politician
- Lars Funke (b. 1972), German speed skater
- Manfred Funke (b. 1955), German weightlifter
- Maxine Funke, New Zealand singer-songwriter
- Michael Funke (b. 1969), German racing driver
- Otto Funke (1828–1879), German physiologist
- Peter Funke (b. 1950), German historian
- Rainer Funke (b. 1940), German politician
- Rich Funke (b. 1949), American journalist and politician
- Sabine Funke (b. 1955), German artist
