= The Josef Sudek Studio =

- Ateliér Josefa Sudka

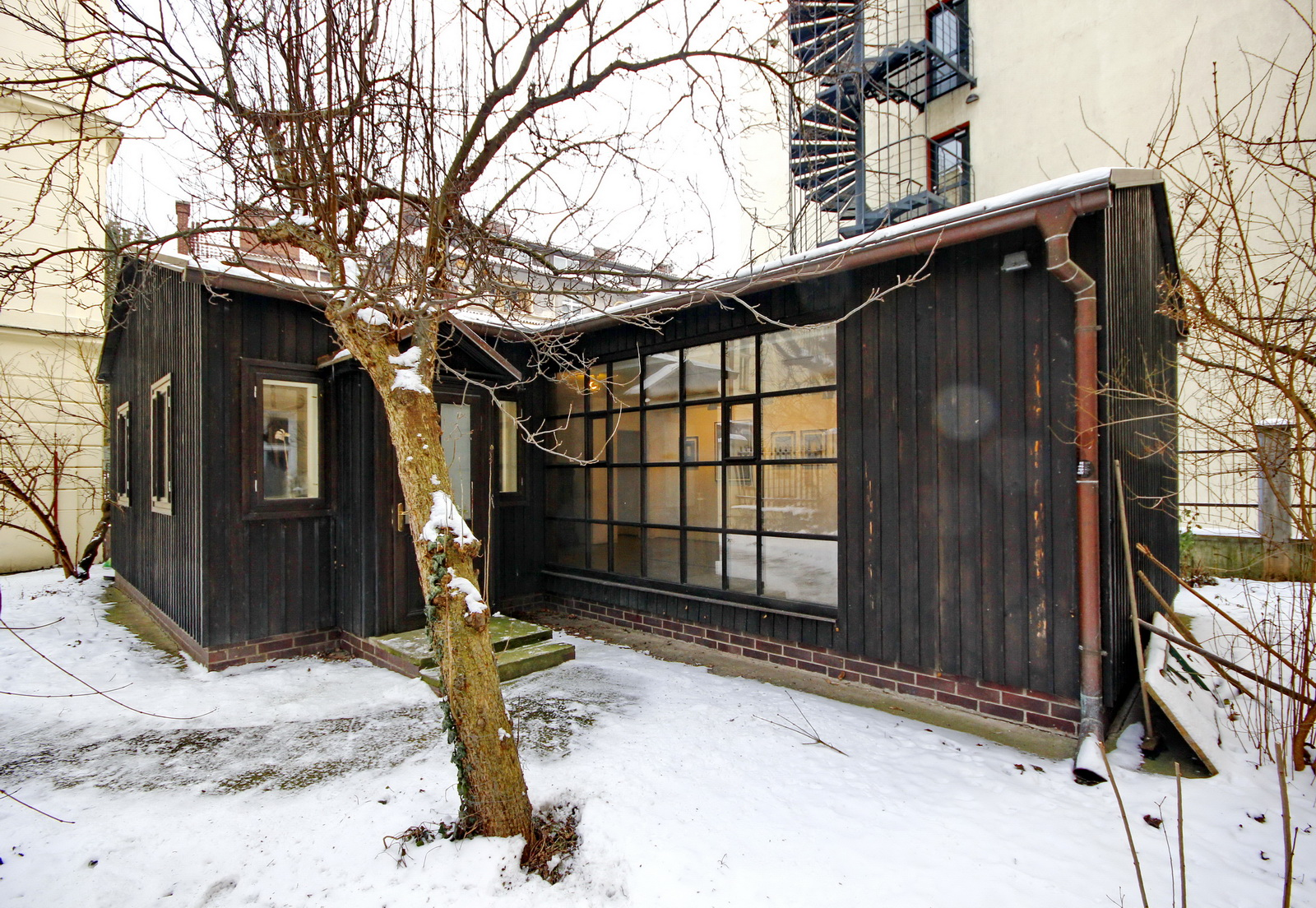
- Interactive fullscreen map
- Established: 1901; 125 years ago
- Location: Újezd 432, Prague 1, Czech Republic, 118 00
- Coordinates: 50°4′57.16″N 14°24′17.93″E
- Website: www.atelierjosefasudka.cz/cs/

The Josef Sudek Studio (Czech: Ateliér Josefa Sudka) is a gallery bearing the name of the renowned Czech photographer Josef Sudek. This single-storey pavilion of only 61 square metres and located in the courtyard of the apartment buildings at no. 432 Újezd, Prague, is a replica of the original that Sudek used from 1927 to 1976. In 1990, the studio was listed as a national heritage site.

== Studio ==
This is the last existing example of this kind of photography studio built at the end of the nineteenth century. It was moved here in 1901 from what would later become the Prague district of Vinohrady. This kind of building was erected in the second half of the nineteenth century thanks to the boom in commercial and art photography. It is a unique piece of the national heritage not only in Prague, but in the whole Czech Republic.

For Sudek the studio was not merely a place to work. It was also a source of inspiration and a frequent subject of his art photography. He photographed it at all times of the day and night and in every season, inside and outside, together with the neglected garden, particularly the strangely twisted tree in front of his now famous studio window.

In 1985, a fire broke out in the studio, destroying the already derelict space. What remained after the firefighters had put out the blaze was unusable. The only solution was to make an exact replica of the original.

A partner on the project and an investor in the construction and subsequent operation of the replica studio was PPF Art, part of the PPF Group investment company. The replica studio was built in 2000 under the aegis of the then mayor of Prague, Jan Kasl, with the participation of the photography historian Anna Fárová, the Borough of Prague 1, the Museum of Decorative Arts in Prague, CMC Architects, Květinový servis, Konstruktiva Branko, Terra Floridus, and Gema Art.

PPF Art operates several art galleries and is the curator of unique collections, including Czech and Slovak photography. The basis of the photography collection is the photographs of Josef Sudek, including a set of photographs salvaged from his burnt-out studio. In addition to the Josef Sudek Studio, PPF Art also operates The Václav Špála Gallery and is the curator of a collection of paintings (and other works of art), which provides a cross-section of Czech painting from the late nineteenth century to the present.

== Exhibitions ==
=== 2001 ===
- Josef Sudek II
- Gabina Fárová
- Emila Medková
- František Drtikol
- Josef Sudek I

=== 2002 ===
- Ivan Pinkava – TNF
- Miro Švolík – Openings and Holes

=== 2004 ===
- Josef Sudek – Dance
- Alexandr Hackenschmied – Prague / Paris / New York

=== 2005 ===
- Michal Kalhous – Kladky
- Antonín Kratochvíl – USSA

=== 2006 ===
- Tereza Sochorová – Writing Reaches Very Far ...
- Jiří Kovanda – I'd Rather Be an Angel
- Alexandra Vajd – Untitled 2003
- Václav Stratil – Pairs

=== 2007 ===
- Jolana Havelková – Landscape 06
- Josef Sudek – Privatissima – Notes from the 1950s to the 1970s

=== 2008 ===
- Josef Sudek – Privatissima – Nocturno

=== 2010 ===
- Václav Jirásek – UPSYCH 316a

=== 2011 ===
- Jan Svoboda – Svoboda's Legacy
- Štěpánka Šimlová – I Love You, But ...
- Josef Sudek – Sudek Reprises
- Dušan Tománek – The Process

=== 2012 ===
- Ivo Přeček – Ivo Přeček
- Tereza Příhodová – Lessons of Solitude
- Ladislav Babuščák – Late Autumn/Early Winter
- From the PPF Art Collection – Twilight in the Rothmayers’ Garden
- Štěpánka Stein and Salim Issa – National Awakening
- Viktor Kopasz – /City.zen/

=== 2013 ===
- Tomáš Pospěch – Curatorial Work / Reloaded
- Michal Ureš – Below the View Through
- Jan Jindra – Inner Landscapes
- Michal Šeba – Nocturnalia
- From the PPF Art Collection – Pictorialists
- Adéla Leinweberová – Cancelled Stop
- Fotograf Festival – Jiří Valoch and Lenka Vítková – Range
- Andreas Wegner – Cabinet

=== 2014 ===
- Jan Tesař – Books and Other Pictures
- Michal Czanderle – Photographs of War, Pt 2
- Libuše Jarcovjáková and Veronika Nastoupilová – Ziellos
- Jiří Thýn – Basic Studies of Non-narrative Photography
- From the PPF Art Collection – The Charm of the Still Life
- Alexander Dobrovodský – Quicksilver Rains
- Fotograf festival – Anna Orlowská – Case Study: Invisibility
- Kateřina Zahradníčková – Island

=== 2015 ===
- Jiří Černický – Real Minimalism
- Tereza Havlinková – I Can Take Your Photograph
- Waanja (Radek Váňa) and Jiří Kovanda – mine mine not yours!
- From the PPF Art Collections – Josef Sudek and Jan Svoboda – A Comparison II
- Tomáš Hrůza – Way Out
- Jan Svoboda – Reconstruction I: The Collection of Jan Svoboda

== See also ==
- Josef Sudek Gallery
- 4176 Sudek (asteroid name for him)
