= Sudek =

Sudek may refer to:

- Josef Sudek, Czech photographer
- Sudek peak, one of the five major peaks of Mount Elgon, located in Kenya
- 4176 Sudek, asteroid

== See also ==
- Saudek
