= Funk House =

Funk House may refer to:

- Funk House (Olympia, Washington), listed on the National Register of Historic Places in Thurston County
- Funk House (Jennings, Louisiana), listed on the National Register of Historic Places in Jefferson Davis Parish, Louisiana

== See also ==
- Jacob Funk House and Barn, Springfield, Pennsylvania, listed on the National Register of Historic Places in Bucks County
- Joseph Funk House, Singers Glen, Virginia, listed on the National Register of Historic Places in Rockingham County
- Harriet Funk House, Jeffersontown, Kentucky, listed on the National Register of Historic Places in Jefferson County, Kentucky
- James H. Funk House, Jeffersontown, Kentucky, listed on the National Register of Historic Places in Jefferson County, Kentucky
- Funky house, a subgenre of house music; a type of dance music
