= Botas (company) =

Czech footwear company

- Company type: Joint-stock company
- Industry: Footwear
- Predecessor: Botana
- Founded: 1949 in Skuteč, Czechoslovakia
- Defunct: 2023
- Fate: Acquired by Vasky
- Headquarters: Skuteč, Czechia
- Area served: International
- Products: Shoes
- Parent: Vasky
- Website: Official website

Botas is a Czech footwear company based in Skuteč, focused on the production of sports shoes. It was founded in 1949 under the name Botana, initially focusing on men's walking shoes. From 1963, it produced shoes under the Botas brand. In 2000, the company's name was changed to match its shoe brand. In 2023, Botas was sold to the Zlín-based company Vasky, which continues to sell shoes under the original brand name.

== History ==
Founded as Botana in 1949 by the merger of smaller nationalized enterprises in Skuteč and neighbouring towns that previously supplied the Bata Corporation, the company initially specialized in men's walking shoes. In 1963, it began producing sports shoes under the Botas brand, derived from the Czech word for shoe, bota, and the initial letter of the town of Skuteč. By the late 1960s, over 50% of their output was in the sports sector, and by 1988, this had grown to 82.9%, with an export market that covered 35 countries.

Between 1990 and 1996, the company manufactured shoes for other brands, including Puma, Jofa, Graf, Koho, CCM, Adidas, Bauer, Karhu, Jackson, and Riedell. In 1992, they signed a contract with Salomon to make skiing, snowboarding, and hiking footwear, a collaboration that continues to the present.

In 2000, along with rebranding to the name Botas, the company shifted its focus to ice hockey, figure skating, and ski footwear, which made up 90% of their production capacity.

=== 2023 sale to Vasky ===
In January 2023, the company stopped production in Skuteč due to rising energy prices, increased manufacturing costs, and the impossibility of exporting to some countries caused by the Russian invasion of Ukraine. A new location for its headquarters was not immediately selected, and the possibility of the company's sale was being considered. In February, it was announced that Botas was in liquidation.

In mid-March, the Zlín-based footwear company Vasky presented a proposal to purchase Botas and maintain production in Skuteč, or otherwise to move it to Zlín. The sale went through in April, with the bulk of production being shifted to Vasky factories and some workshops being kept in Skuteč. Botas footwear will continue to be sold under the original brand.
