= List of Carnegie libraries in Louisiana =

Louisiana Carnegie library buildings still standing

The following list of Carnegie libraries in Louisiana provides detailed information on United States Carnegie libraries in Louisiana, where 9 libraries were built from 4 grants (totaling $380,000) awarded by the Carnegie Corporation of New York from 1901 to 1907. As of 2013, 6 of these buildings are still standing, and 3 still operate as libraries.

== Key ==
Building still operating as a library
Building standing, but now serving another purpose
Building no longer standing
Building listed on the National Register of Historic Places

== Carnegie libraries ==
	Library	City or town	Image	Date granted	Grant amount	Location	Notes
1	Alexandria	Alexandria		Apr 8, 1907	$10,000	503 Washington St.	Now a museum and genealogical library
2	Jennings	Jennings		Mar 9, 1907	$10,000	303 Cary Ave.	
3	Lake Charles	Lake Charles		Oct 17, 1901	$10,000	411 Pujo St.	Replaced c.1950
4	New Orleans Main	New Orleans		Dec 29, 1902	$350,000		Demolished c.1960
5	New Orleans Algiers	New Orleans		Dec 29, 1902	—	725 Pelican Ave.	
6	New Orleans Canal	New Orleans		Dec 29, 1902	—	2940 Canal St.	Open 1911–1958, now a yoga center
7	New Orleans Dryades	New Orleans		Dec 29, 1902	—	1924 Philip St.	"Colored" branch during the era of racial segregation, open 1915–1965. Now a YMCA center
8	New Orleans Napoleon	New Orleans		Dec 29, 1902	—	913 Napoleon Ave.	
9	New Orleans Royal	New Orleans		Dec 29, 1902	—		Severely damaged by Hurricane Betsy in 1965, demolished

== See also ==
- List of libraries in the United States
