= Adolf Schneeberger =

Czech photographer (1897–1977)

Adolf Schneeberger (born in Choceň, 6/14/1897 - Prague, 1977) was a Czech photographer.

He studied engineering and photography at the Czech Technical University in Prague, 1914. He was the founder of the Czech Photographic Society with Jaromir Funke (1896-1945), and Ludvik Dvorak (1891-1969) and Josef Sudek (1896-1976) in 1924. The group was heavily influenced by American photographer Alfred Stieglitz (1864-1946) and his circle of photographers.

== Selected Public Collections ==
- Getty, Los Angeles, California- Triple Portrait [Adolf Schneeberger, Josef Sudek, Jaromir Funke] about 1924
- Museum of Contemporary Photography, Columbia College, Chicago, Illinois, USA
- National Gallery of Art, Washington, DC, USA
- The Art Institute of Chicago, Chicago, IL

== Books of Adolf Schneeberger's works ==
- Dufek, Antonín: Adolf Schneeberge Prague: Odeon, 1983.
- Josef, Váša: Fotografická tvorba Adolfa Schneebergera FAMU Praha, 1978
- Adlerová Alena, Alborch Carmen, Bydžovská Lenka, Dufek Antonín, Frampton Kenneth, Kubová Alena, Lahoda Vojtěch: The Art of the Avant-garde in Czechoslovakia 1918 - 1938 Institut Valencia d´Art Modern, 1993 ISBN 84-482-0108-6
- Birgus, Vladimír: Czech Photographic Avant-Garde, 1918–1948, Publisher: Cambridge, Mass. : MIT Press, 2002 ISBN 0-262-02516-7
