= Jan Tesař =

Jan Tesař may refer to:

- Jan Tesař (athlete)
- Jan Tesař (historian)
