= Skuteč =

- Town
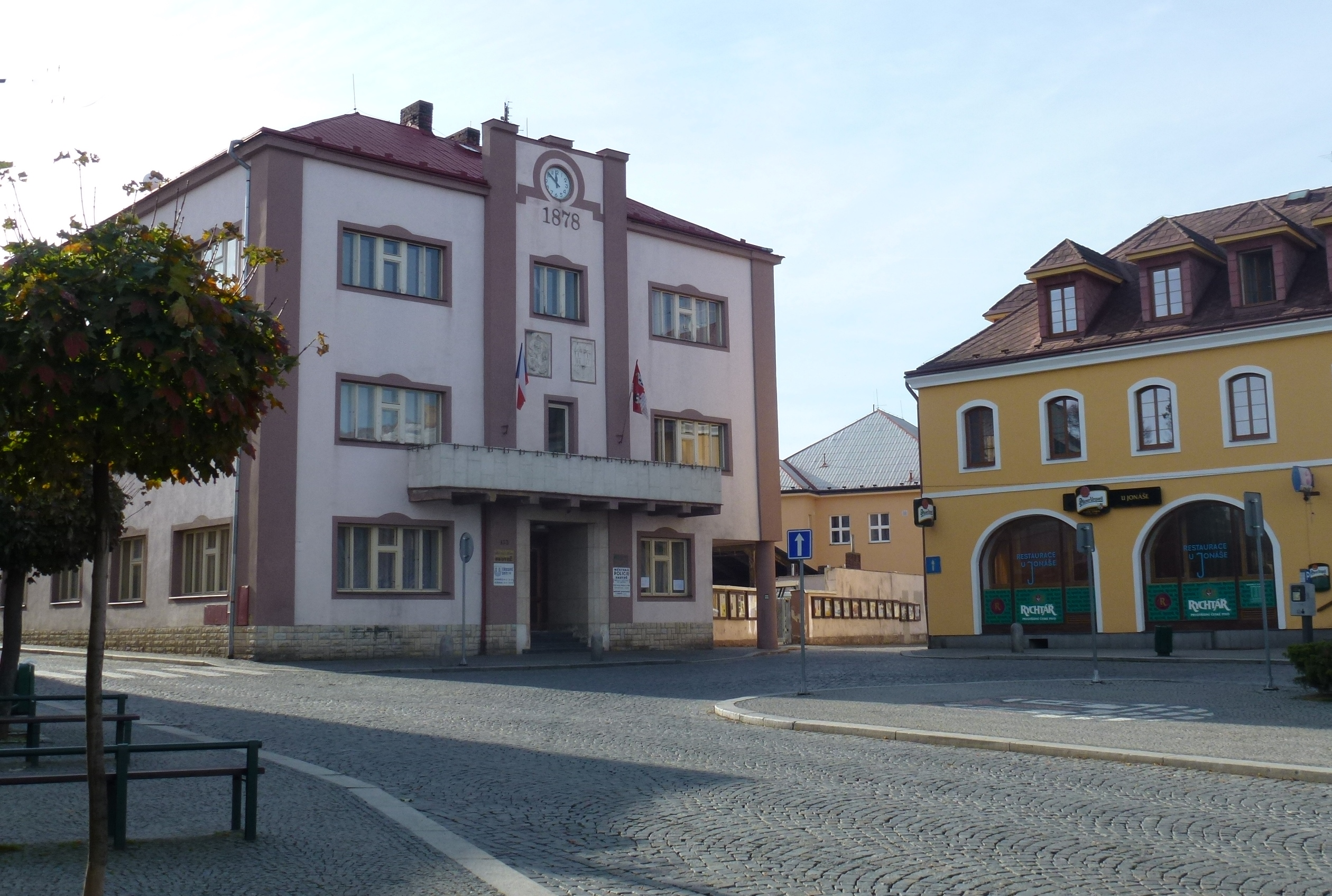
- Town hall on the square Palackého náměstí

- Flag Coat of arms

- Location in the Czech Republic
- Coordinates: 49°50′47″N 15°59′45″E
- Country: Czech Republic
- Region: Pardubice
- District: Chrudim
- First mentioned: 1282

Government
  - Mayor: Jaroslav Hetfleiš

Area
  - Total: 35.40 km^{2} (13.67 sq mi)
- Elevation: 410 m (1,350 ft)

Population (2026-01-01)
  - Total: 5,061
  - Density: 143.0/km^{2} (370.3/sq mi)
- Time zone: UTC+1 (CET)
  - Summer (DST): UTC+2 (CEST)
- Postal code: 539 73
- Website: www.skutec.cz

Skuteč (Czech pronunciation: [ˈskutɛtʃ]; German: Skutsch) is a town in Chrudim District in the Pardubice Region of the Czech Republic. It has about 5,100 inhabitants. The town proper is located in the Iron Mountains.

Skuteč probably became a town in the first half of the 14th century. The main landmark of the town is the Church of the Assumption of the Virgin Mary.

== Administrative division ==
Skuteč consists of 13 municipal parts (in brackets population according to the 2021 census):

- Skuteč (3,732)
- Borek (2)
- Hněvětice (62)
- Lažany (110)
- Lešany (41)
- Lhota u Skutče (62)
- Nová Ves (12)
- Radčice (226)
- Skutíčko (152)
- Štěpánov (176)
- Zbožnov (107)
- Žďárec u Skutče (306)
- Zhoř (48)

Lešany forms an exclave of the municipal territory.

== Etymology ==
The name Skuteč is derived from the personal name Skutek, meaning "Skutek's (court)".

== Geography ==
Skuteč is located about 18 kilometres (11 mi) southeast of Chrudim and 26 km (16 mi) southeast of Pardubice. It lies mostly the undulating and hilly landscape of the Iron Mountains, only the northern part of the municipal territory extends into the Svitavy Uplands. A part of the Anenské Valley Nature Reserve around the stream Anenský potok is located in the territory.

== History ==
The first written mention of Skuteč is from 1289. The settlement was located on a side trade route. Skuteč was promoted to a town probably in the first half of the 14th century. It was one of the larger towns in the region. Its development was slowed down by the Thirty Years' War. In 1862 and 1867, the town was severely damaged by large fires.

== Demographics ==
Historical population

Year	Pop.	±%
1869	5,362	—
1880	5,592	+4.3%
1890	5,834	+4.3%
1900	6,605	+13.2%
1910	6,981	+5.7%

Year	Pop.	±%
1921	6,539	−6.3%
1930	6,658	+1.8%
1950	5,013	−24.7%
1961	5,270	+5.1%
1970	5,220	−0.9%

Year	Pop.	±%
1980	5,387	+3.2%
1991	5,206	−3.4%
2001	5,344	+2.7%
2011	5,183	−3.0%
2021	5,036	−2.8%

Source: Censuses

== Economy ==
Skuteč is significantly associated with shoemaking, represented by the company Botas, and for granite mining. While mining is still active, shoe production in Skuteč ended in 2022, and it is being considered to move the brand's production elsewhere.

== Transport ==
Skuteč is located on the railway line Pardubice–Svitavy.

== Education ==
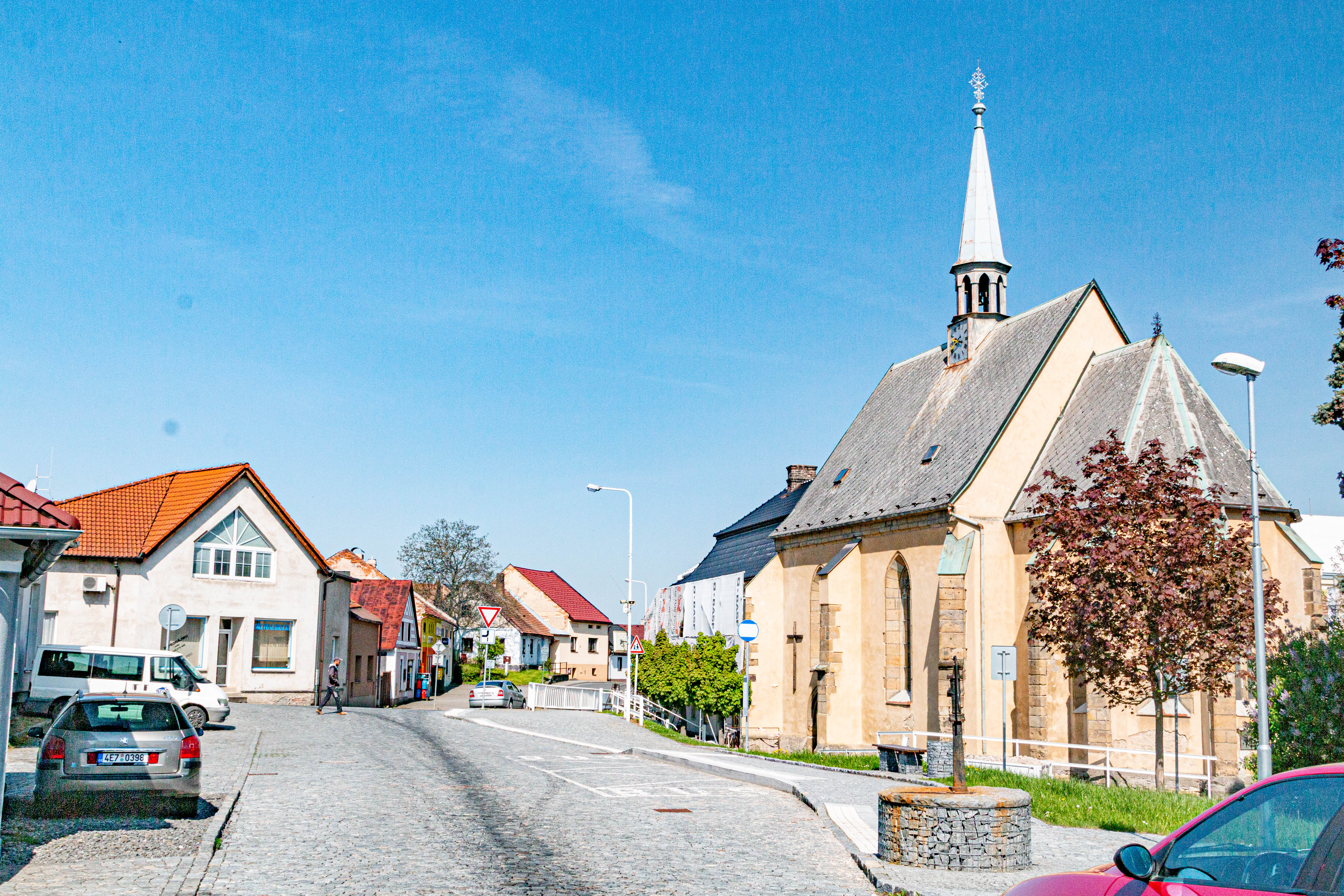
Church of the Corpus Christi

The town has two primary schools and Vítězslav Novák Art School. Since 2000, there is the Gymnasium of the Sovereign Maltese Knights Order.

== Culture ==
Since 2003, the town hosts Tomášek's and Novák's Musical Skuteč, an annual festival of classical music and choir singing.

== Sights ==
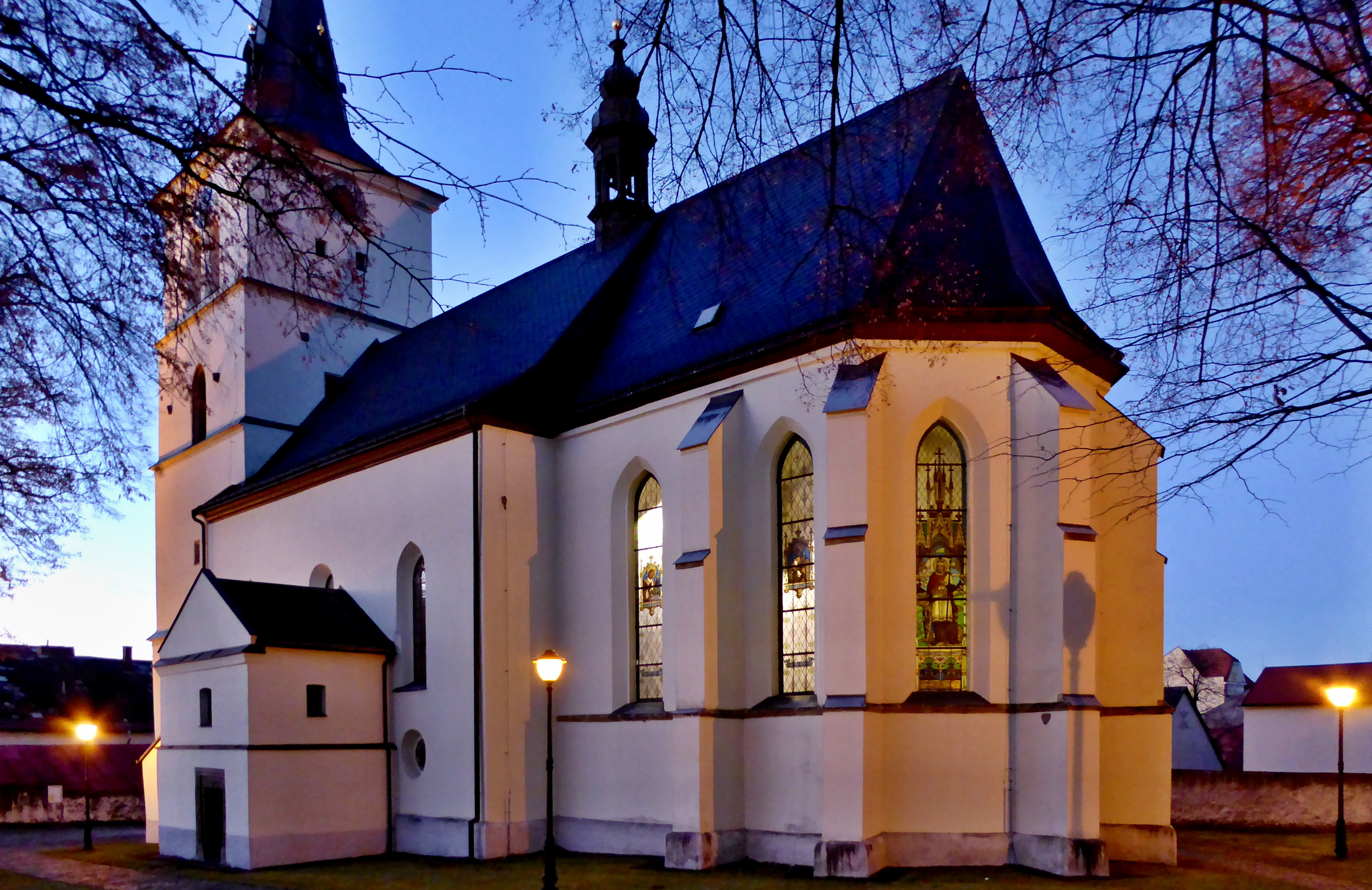
Church of the Assumption of the Virgin Mary

The most notable buildings are the churches. The main landmark of the town centre is the Church of the Assumption of the Virgin Mary. It was originally built in the late Gothic style, then it was rebuilt in the Renaissance style and modified in the Baroque style. However, many late Gothic elements have been preserved.

The Church of the Corpus Christi was built in the Gothic style in 1391–1392. It was reconstructed in 1812. In 1865–1866, after it was damaged by the 1862 fire, it was reconstructed again and its Gothic appearance was restored.

The Church of Saint Wenceslaus is a rural church located in Lažany. It dates from the third quarter of the 14th century. The originally Gothic building was reconstructed and modified several times in the 16th–18th centuries.

The Church of Saint Matthias is located in Štěpánov. It was founded in 1349. It is also a rural church with a complicated construction history. Its present form is mainly a result of the Renaissance and late Baroque reconstructions.

The birthplace of the most famous native, composer Václav Tomášek, is a folk architecture house from the 18th century with a small exhibition of his life and work.

== Notable people ==
- Václav Tomášek (1774–1850), composer and music teacher
- Vítězslav Novák (1870–1949), composer; lived and died here
- Jaromír Funke (1896–1945), photographer
- Jiří Zástěra (1913–1983), football player and manager
- Karel Bartošek (1930–2004), Czech-French historian
- Jan Tesař (born 1933), historian
- Tomáš Malínský (born 1991), footballer
