= Elton United Methodist Church =

Historic church in Louisiana, United States

- U.S. National Register of Historic Places
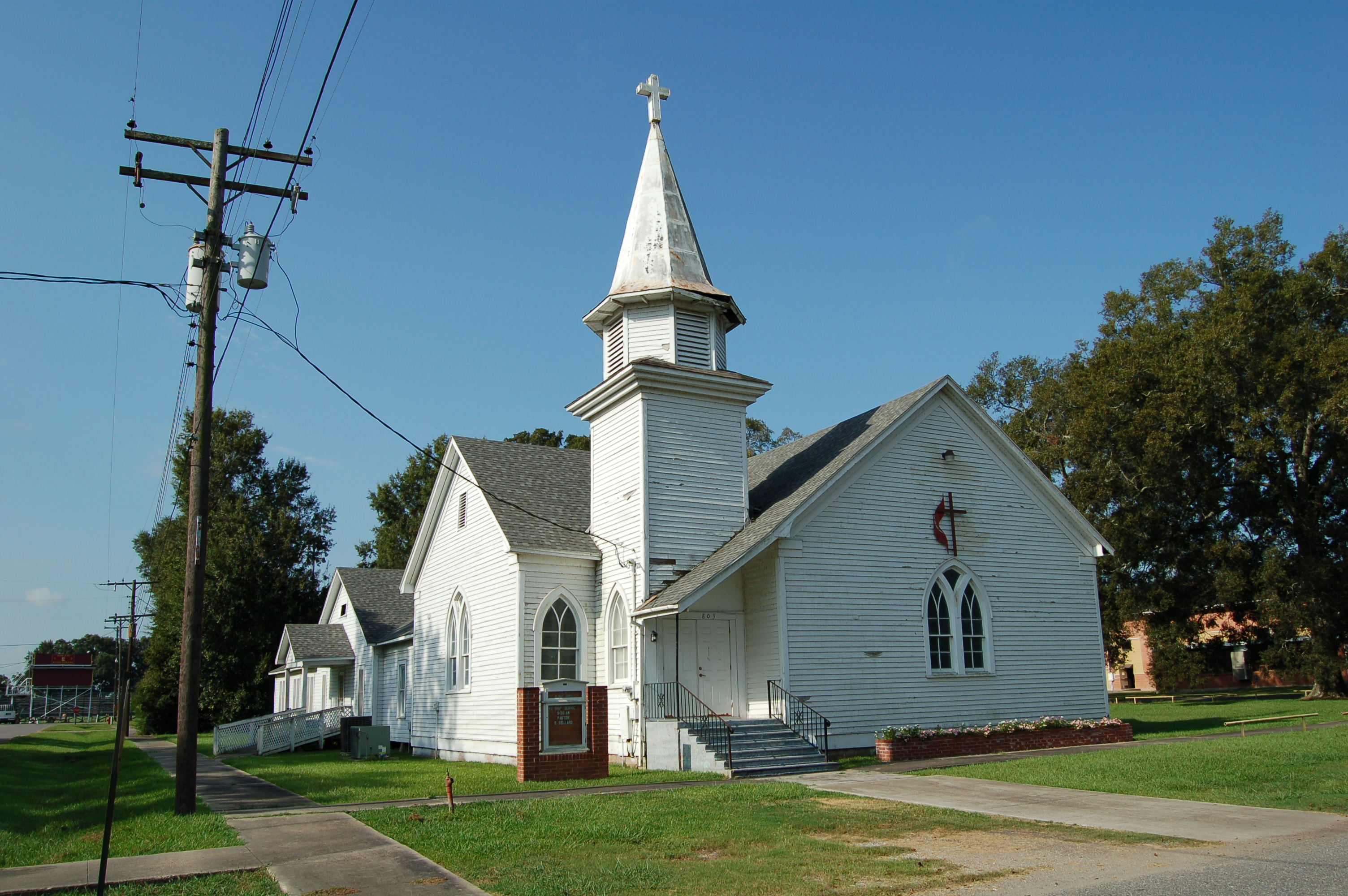

- Location within Louisiana Location within the United States
- Location: 803 2nd Street, Elton, Louisiana
- Coordinates: 30°28′44″N 92°41′31″W
- Area: less than one acre
- Built: 1911
- Architect: Jesse Johnson
- Architectural style: Gothic Revival
- NRHP reference No.: 94001174
- Added to NRHP: September 30, 1994

The Elton United Methodist Church is a historic church located at 803 2nd Street in Elton in Jefferson Davis Parish, Louisiana.

Built in 1911, it is a wood frame Gothic Revival-style church, and is a rare example of that in the parish. It has a bell tower at its entrance. Its windows have muntins making simple patterns. Despite a largish addition to the rear in the 1950s or 1960s that detracts somewhat from the architectural character of the building, the church overall integrity remains intact.

The church was added to the National Register of Historic Places on September 30, 1994.

== See also ==
- National Register of Historic Places listings in Jefferson Davis Parish, Louisiana
