= Jiří Zástěra =

Czechoslovak footballer and manager (1913–1983)

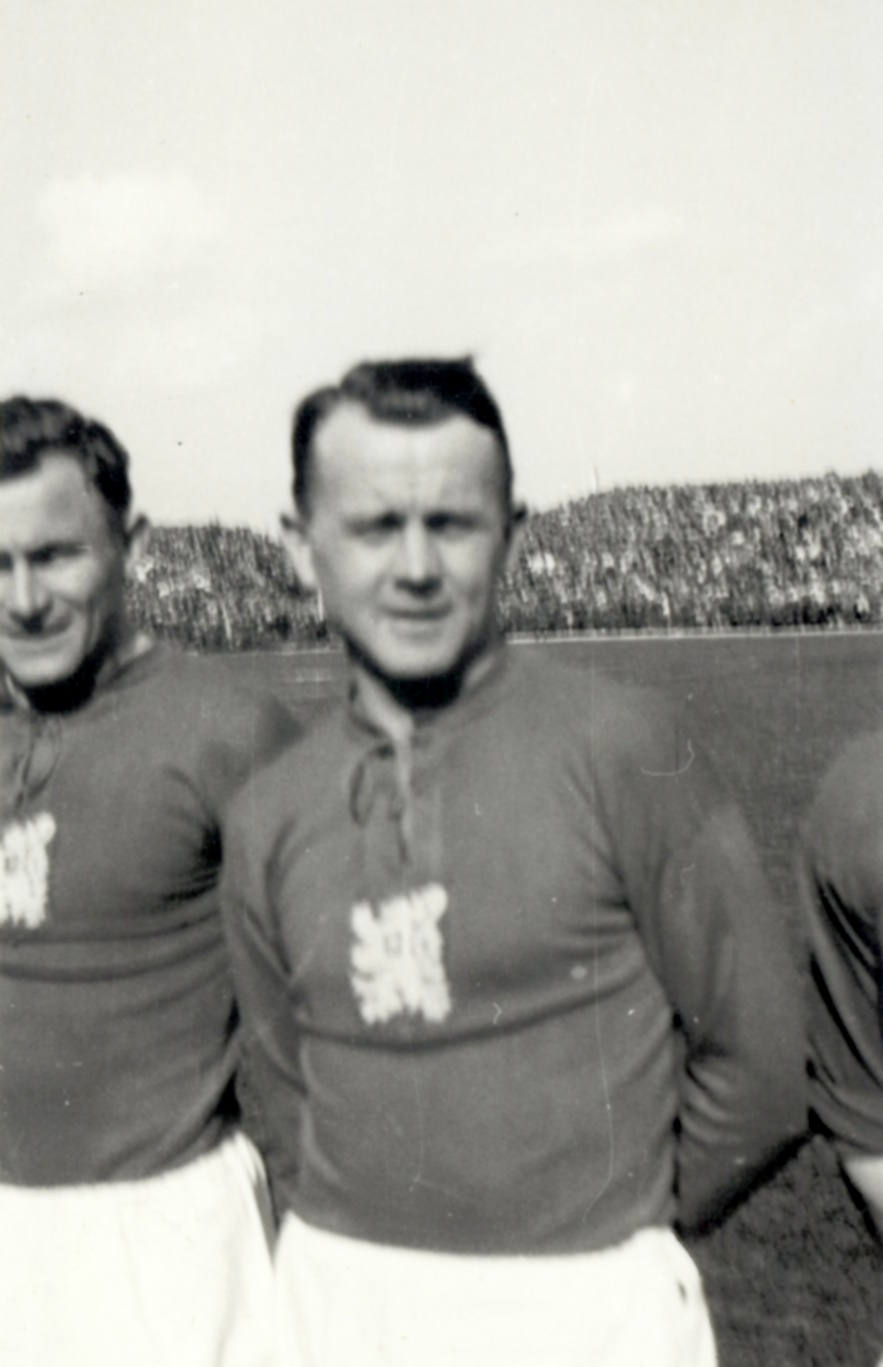
- Zástěra with the Czechoslovakia national team

Personal information
- Date of birth: 9 November 1913
- Place of birth: Skuteč, Austria-Hungary
- Date of death: 15 August 1983 (aged 69)
- Place of death: Holice, Czechoslovakia
- Position: Defender

Senior career*
Years	Team	Apps	(Gls)
1937–1943	SK Pardubice		
1942–1948	Sparta Prague		

International career
1946–1948	Czechoslovakia	3	(0)

Managerial career
- 1948: ATK Prague
- 1957–1959: Dukla Pardubice
- 1959–1963: Spartak Hradec Králové
- * Club domestic league appearances and goals

Jiří Zástěra (9 November 1913 – 15 August 1983) was a football player and manager. He made 198 appearances in the Czechoslovak First League, scoring three goals. He played three matches for Czechoslovakia. As a manager, Zástěra led numerous teams. He led ATK Prague to an eighth-place finish in 1948. He later won the 1959–60 Czechoslovak First League with Spartak Hradec Králové.
