= Soudek =

Soudek is a surname. Notable people with the surname include:

- Ernst Soudek (born 1940), Austrian discus thrower
- Robin Soudek (born 1991), Czech ice hockey player

== See also ==
- Saudek
