= S.A. Pennington House =

Historic house in Louisiana, United States

- S. A. Pennington House
- U.S. National Register of Historic Places
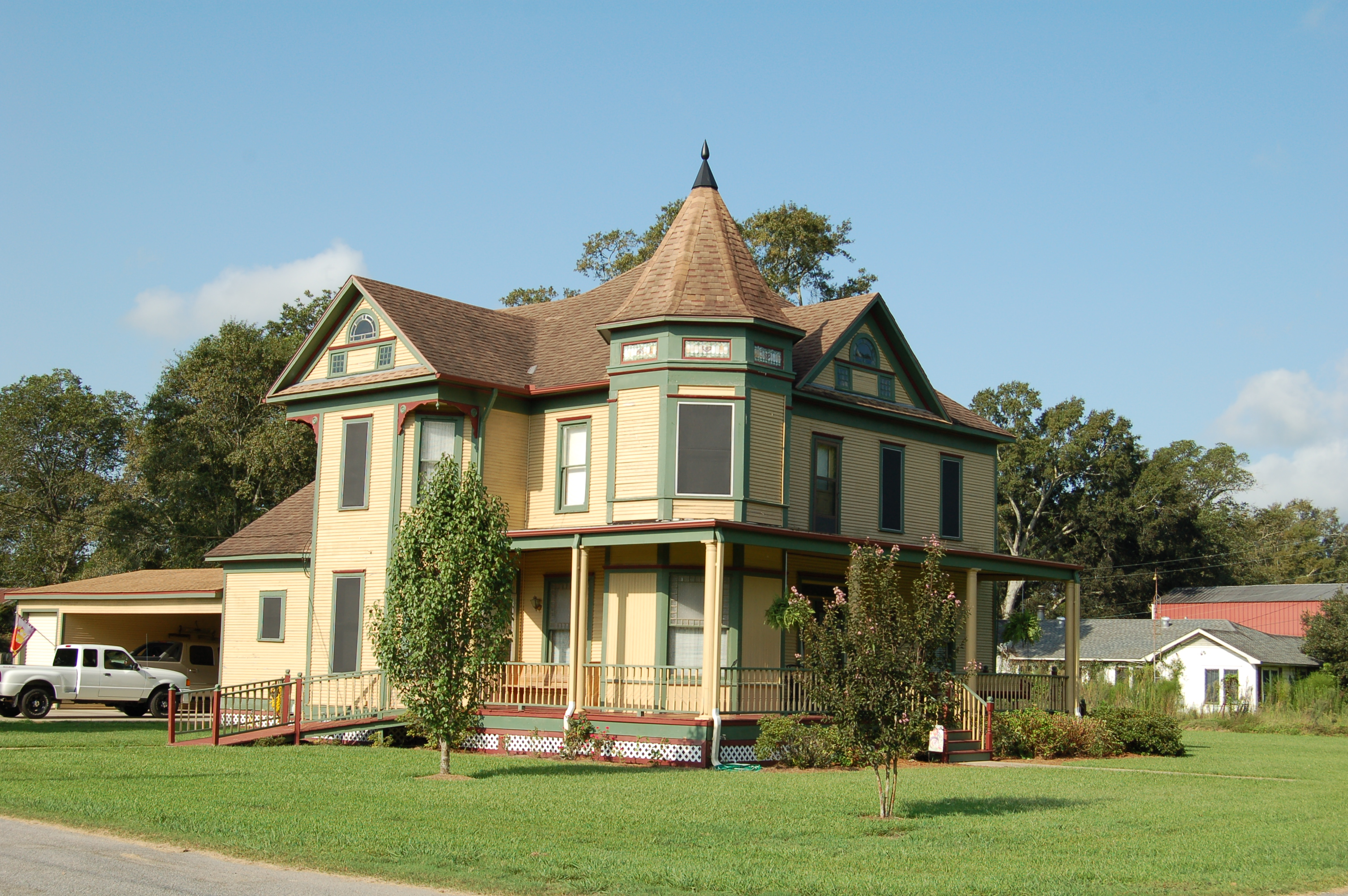

- Location within Louisiana Location within the United States
- Location: 1003 2nd Street, Elton, Louisiana
- Coordinates: 30°28′44″N 92°41′42″W
- Area: less than one acre
- Built: 1911
- Architectural style: Queen Anne, Colonial Revival, Stick/Eastlake
- NRHP reference No.: 94001199
- Added to NRHP: October 7, 1994

The S. A. Pennington House, located at 1003 2nd Street in Elton in Jefferson Davis Parish, Louisiana, was built in 1911. It was listed on the National Register of Historic Places in 1994.

It is a two-story wood-frame house mainly Queen Anne in style, though with aspects of Colonial Revival and Stick/Eastlake. Queen Anne features include its two-story polygonal turret, a band of stained glass windows on the turret just below the roofline, and projecting bays and rooms.

It was the home of Dr. S. A. Pennington, Elton's first resident physician, who got his M.D. degree from the University of Tennessee at Nashville in 1900, and who also studied at the New York Graduate School of Medicine. He practiced in Jacoby, Louisiana before coming to Elton in about 1907, where he stayed for 11 years.

In 1994, the house served as the parsonage of the First Baptist Church of Elton.

== See also ==
- National Register of Historic Places listings in Jefferson Davis Parish, Louisiana
