= Saudek =

Saudek (feminine: Saudková) is a Czech surname. Notable people with the surname include:

- Jan Saudek (born 1935), Czech photographer
- Kája Saudek (1935–2015), Czech comics illustrator
- Robert Saudek (1880–1935), Czech graphologist and writer
- Robert Saudek (television executive) (1911–1997), American TV producer and executive

== See also ==
- Sudek (disambiguation)
- Soudek
