= Calkins-Orvis House =

Historic house in Louisiana, United States

- Calkins--Orvis House
- U.S. National Register of Historic Places
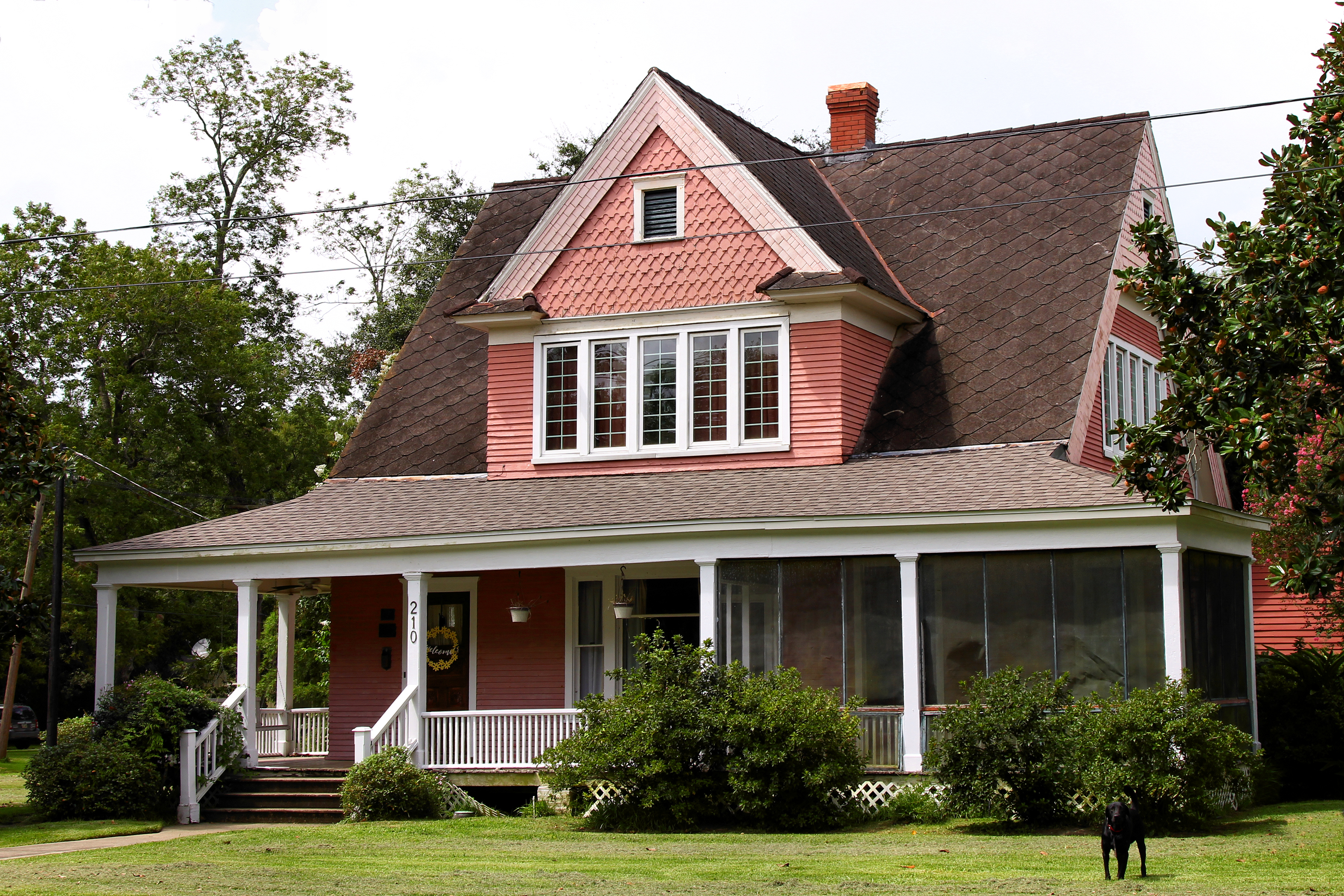

- Location within Louisiana Location within the United States
- Location: 210 West Nichols Street, Welsh, Louisiana
- Coordinates: 30°14′06″N 92°49′24″W
- Area: less than one acre
- Built: 1901
- Architectural style: Queen Anne
- NRHP reference No.: 98000438
- Added to NRHP: May 8, 1998

The Calkins-Orvis House is a historic house located at 210 West Nichols Street in Welsh, Louisiana.

Built in 1901, it is a one-and-a-half-story Queen Anne-style house. It was listed for having "local architectural significance as a landmark in the turn-of-the-century residential heritage of Welsh. This status is based upon its unusual massing (most notably the distinctive treatment of its side gables) and its profusion of intricate shinglework."

The house was listed on the National Register of Historic Places on May 8, 1998.

== See also ==
- National Register of Historic Places listings in Jefferson Davis Parish, Louisiana
