= Jennings Post Office =

- U.S. National Register of Historic Places
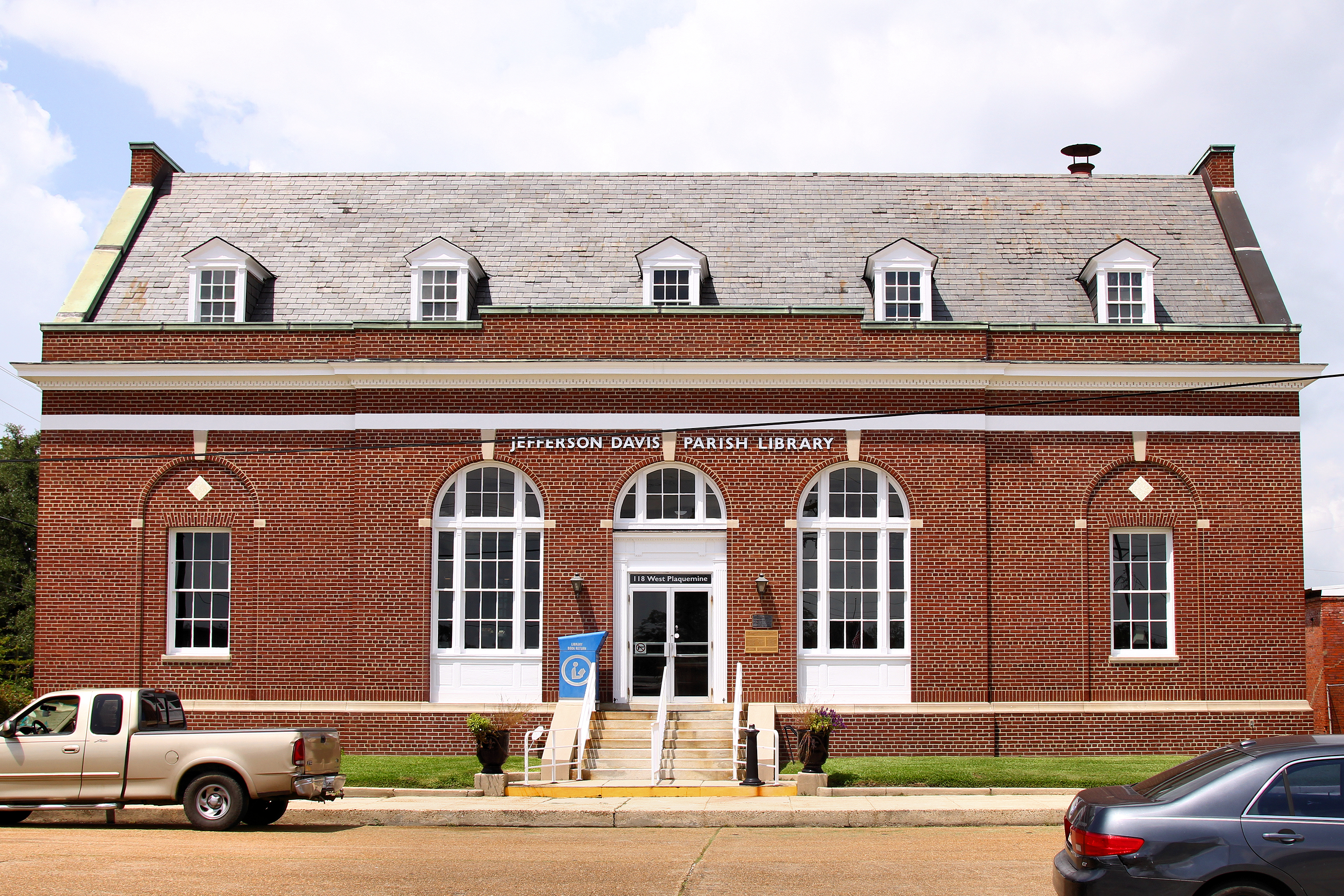

- Location within Louisiana Location within the United States
- Location: 118 West Plaquemine Street, Jennings, Louisiana
- Coordinates: 30°13′22″N 92°39′32″W
- Area: less than one acre
- Built: 1915
- Architect: James A. Wetmore
- Architectural style: Neo-Federal
- NRHP reference No.: 82002777
- Added to NRHP: May 20, 1982

The old Jennings Post Office is a historic post office building located at 118 West Plaquemine Street in Jennings, Louisiana. It is currently used as the Jefferson Davis Parish Library.

It is a 1 1/2-story brick public building described as "Neo-Federal" in style, which served as post office for Jennings from 1915 until 1976. It was renovated and reopened as the headquarters of the Jefferson Davis Parish library system in 1979.

Its design is credited to James A. Wetmore, but the NRHP nomination asserts it is "actually the work of Louis A. Simon. Although Wetmore was federal supervising architect from 1915 to 1933, he was a lawyer by training, and his design responsibilities were carried out by Simon, who was superintendent of the architectural section of the Office of the Supervising Architect."

The building was listed on the National Register of Historic Places on May 20, 1982.

== See also ==
- National Register of Historic Places listings in Jefferson Davis Parish, Louisiana
