= More Mileage Gas Station =

- U.S. National Register of Historic Places
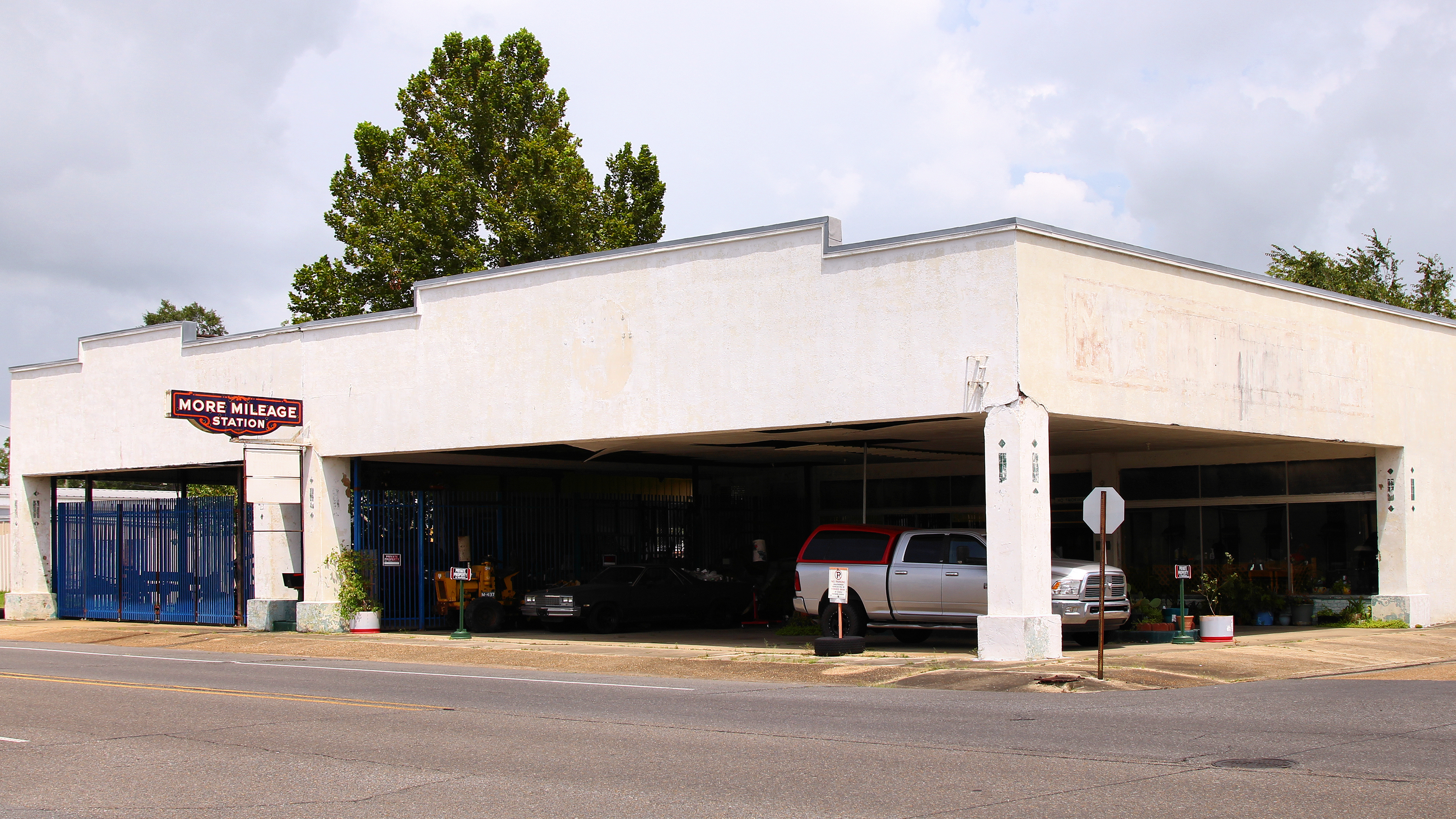

- Location within Louisiana Location within the United States
- Location: 602 North Main Street, Jennings, Louisiana
- Coordinates: 30°13′32″N 92°39′28″W
- Area: less than one acre
- Built: 1938
- Architect: C.C. Wicker
- NRHP reference No.: 04000637
- Added to NRHP: June 22, 2004

The More Mileage Gas Station, located at 602 North Main in Jennings in Jefferson Davis Parish, Louisiana, is a historic filling station which was built in 1938. It was listed on the National Register of Historic Places on June 22, 2004.

It was deemed to be "locally significant in the history of transportation as a rare surviving example of a once considerably more common building type in the Jefferson Davis parish seat of Jennings. Historic filling stations are icons of the early automobile age, but given the ever-changing world of commerce, they are becoming a rare breed."

== See also ==
- National Register of Historic Places listings in Jefferson Davis Parish, Louisiana
