= Angelus (Jennings, Louisiana) =

Historic house in Louisiana, United States

- U.S. National Register of Historic Places
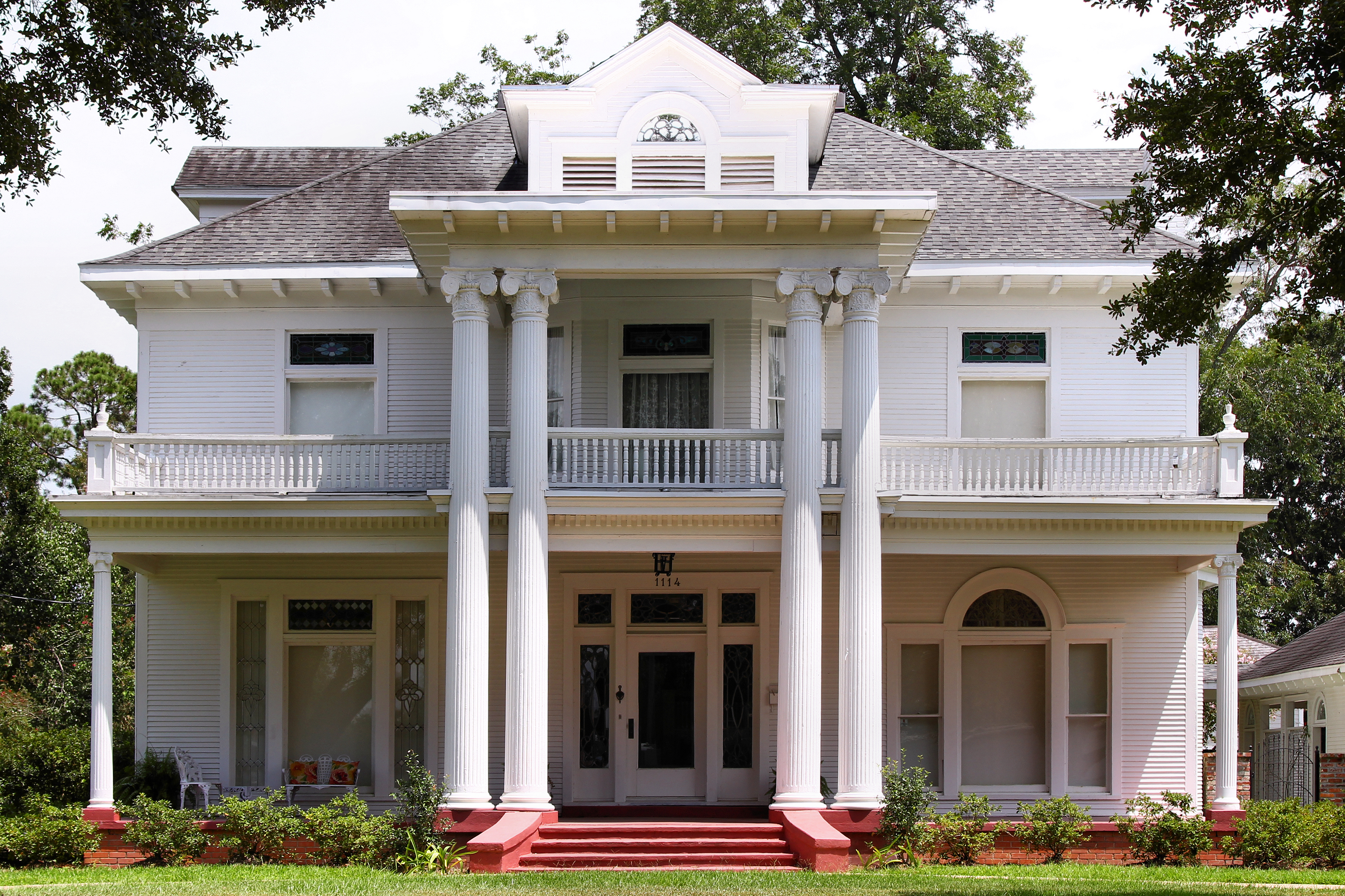

- Location within Louisiana Location within the United States
- Location: 1114 North Cutting Avenue, Jennings, Louisiana
- Coordinates: 30°13′53″N 92°39′16″W
- Area: 1 acre (0.40 ha)
- Built: 1907
- Architectural style: Colonial Revival
- NRHP reference No.: 93000296
- Added to NRHP: April 16, 1993

Angelus is a historic house located at 1114 North Cutting Avenue in Jennings, Louisiana.

Built by the Jaenke family in 1907, the two-story frame house is Colonial Revival in style. Its entrance portico includes two sets of paired Ionic columns.

A second one and a half story contributing building is present in the area, as well as a non-contributing modern carport/storage building.

The house was listed on the National Register of Historic Places on April 16, 1993.

== See also ==
- National Register of Historic Places listings in Jefferson Davis Parish, Louisiana
