= Dryades Branch Library =

Coordinates: 29°56′10″N 90°05′04″W

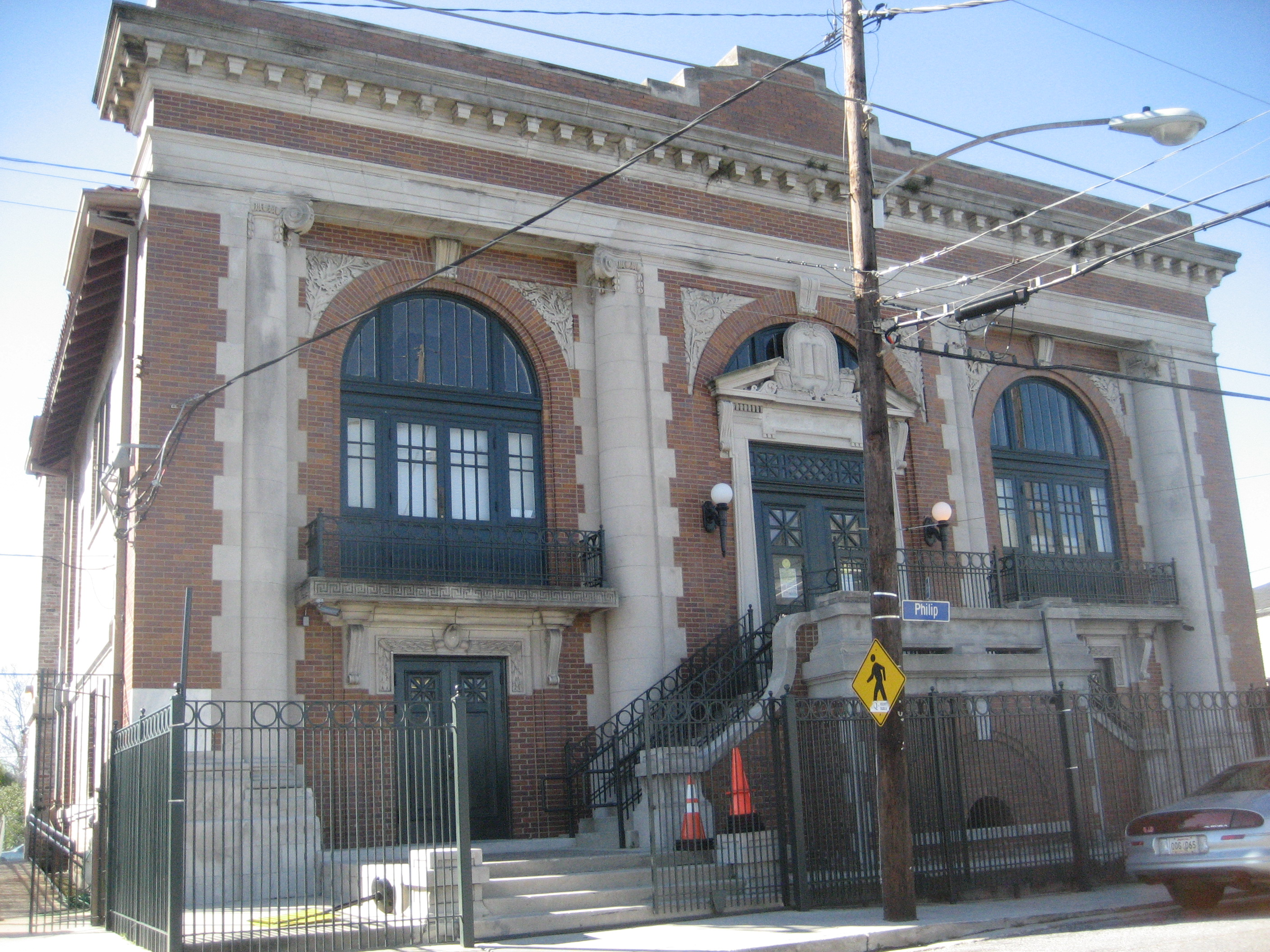

Dryades Branch Library is part of the New Orleans Public Library system. It served African Americans during segregation. It is on Dryades Street at Philip Street and opened in 1915. It is listed on the National Register of Historic Places.

It was the first library for black residents in the area. The Negro Board of Trade, the National Association for the Advancement of Colored People (NAACP), and Young Men’s Christian Association (YMCA) met at it. It is now a YMCA. The area's libraries desegregated in 1955. It closed in 1965 after damage from Hurricane Betsy.

== History ==
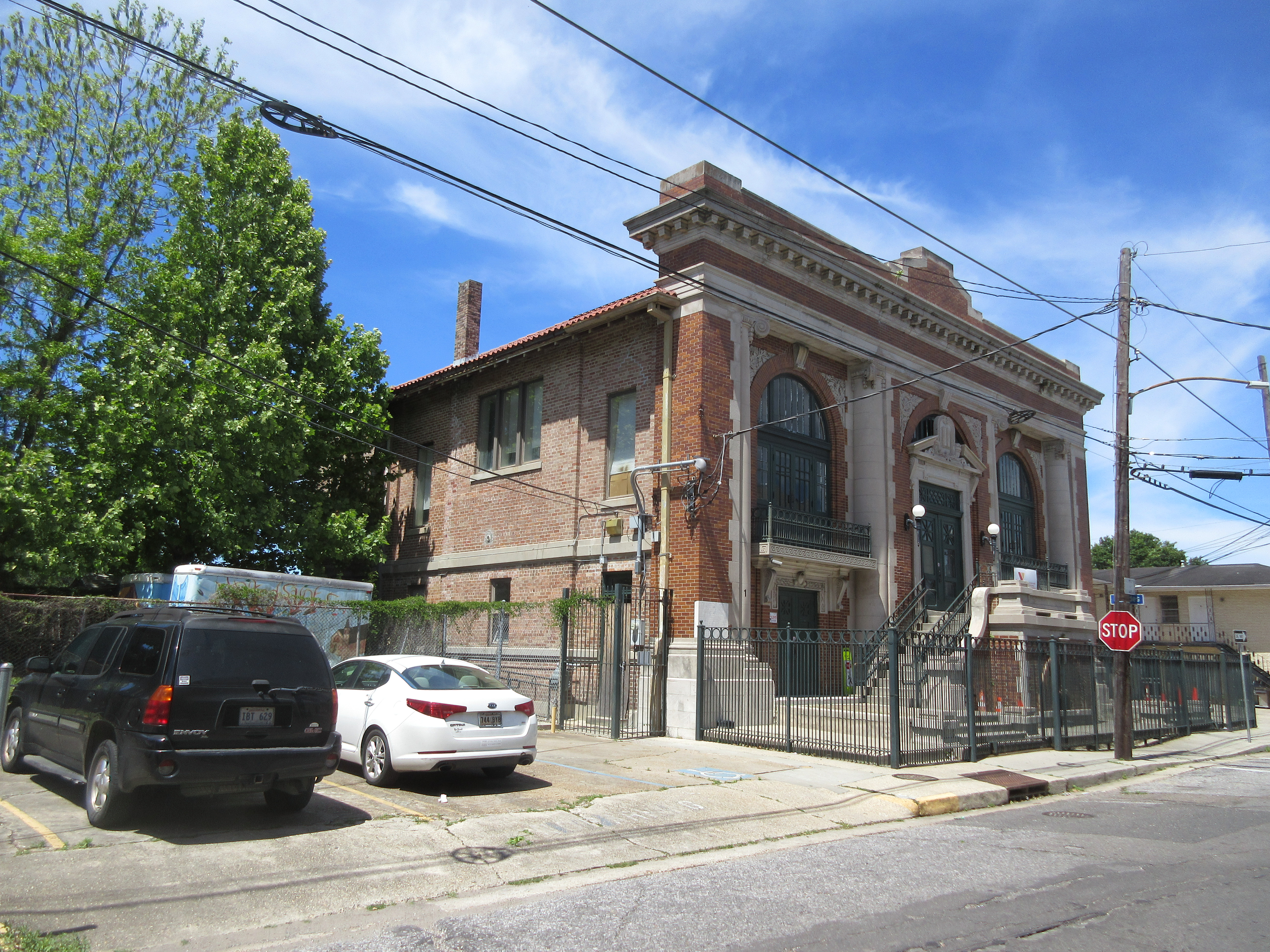

James Hardy Dillard and clergyman Robert E. Jones helped advocate for it and received support from Booker T. Washington that helped gain city support and funding from the Andrew Carnegie Foundation. William Richard Burk was the architect.

Adelia Trent and Delia Allen were its first librarians. The Nora Navra Library opened in 1953 in the 7th ward and was the next library built for black patrons in New Orleans. A building fire in September 1965 caused $50,000 of damage.

== See also ==
- List of Carnegie libraries in Louisiana
- National Register of Historic Places listings in Orleans Parish, Louisiana
- Central City Historic District (New Orleans, Louisiana)
- William Richard Burk, architect
