= Jan-Lukas Funke =

German footballer

Personal information
- Date of birth: 20 July 1999 (age 27)
- Place of birth: Germany
- Height: 1.80 m (5 ft 11 in)
- Position: Defender

Youth career
- 2014–2015: RB Leipzig
- 2015–2017: TSV 1860 Munich
- 2017–2018: Eintracht Braunschweig

Senior career*
Years	Team	Apps	(Gls)
2017–2019	Eintracht Braunschweig II	20	(1)
2019–2020	FC Viktoria Köln II	1	(0)
2019–2020	FC Viktoria Köln	7	(0)
- * Club domestic league appearances and goals as of 4 July 2020

Jan-Lukas Funke (born 20 July 1999) is a German footballer.
