= Riedell Skates =

American skate manufacturer

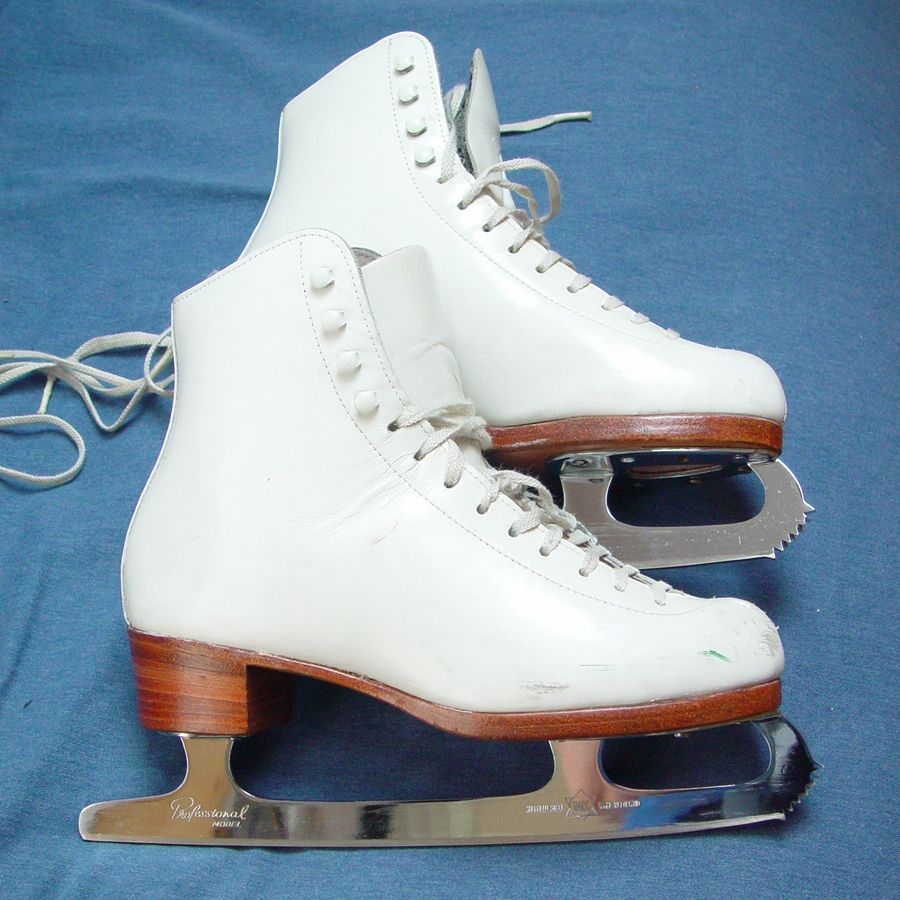
A pair of Riedell figure skating boots

Riedell Shoe Inc. was founded in Red Wing, Minnesota, United States, in 1945 by a former Red Wing Shoes employee. The founder, Paul Riedell, wanted to design widely available and affordable ice skates. This task secured him a spot in both the ice and roller skating hall of fame.

== 2020s ==
In the 2020s the company was operated by four grandsons of the founders.

The company faced a supply-chain shortage issue due to COVID-19 in 2020 that continued into 2021, causing a roller skate shortage.

Riedell is also the manufacturer of Moxi, a fashion-forward colorful brand of roller skates founded by pro skater Michelle “Estro Jen” Steilen. It also manufactures roller derby- and park-focused brand Antik Skates, a brand originally produced in cooperation with Mo "Quadzilla LK" Sanders before the company terminated its association with Sanders in 2018. Riedell continues to produce brands associated with Antik including Gumball toe stops, Moto bearings, and CIB wheels.

Riedell provided custom roller skates worn by Usher during the halftime show of Super Bowl LVIII in 2024, which were used in the performance segment of his song “OMG.”
