= Sabine Funke =

German painter (born 1955)

Sabine Funke (born 1955, in Bochum) is a German painter who lives and works since 1987 in Karlsruhe.

== Biography ==
Funke studied art history in Bochum, Germany free graphics at the University of Essen Folkwang University and painting as well as art theory at Academy of Fine Arts Städelschule, Frankfurt am Main. She graduated as a Master student under the painter Raimer Jochims. In 1985, she received a scholarship from the Arts Foundation of Baden-Württemberg. In 1995, she won the prize for painting of the Westphalian Kunstverein Münster and a grant from the Deutsche Akademie Rom Villa Massimo in Olevano Romano. In 2001, she received a scholarship from the Foundation Cultural Fund Berlin, Ahrenshoop and in 2005 she was awarded with the Hanna Nagel Prize.

Her work has been shown in solo exhibitions among others at the Kunsthalle Bielefeld, Kunsthalle Mannheim, in the Orangerie at the Kunsthalle Karlsruhe, the shown Josef Albers Museum Quadrat in Bottrop, the Städtische Galerie Karlsruhe, and at the Städtische Galerie Offenburg.

The artist is concerned with the interaction of colour and can be situated in the tradition of colour field painting. She paints using highly diluted acrylic paints on wooden panels (panel paintings) and since 2018 on canvas. Since 1999, she also creates large format colour field compositions directly on interior walls. Her mural paintings focus in particular on the spatial effect of the colours thereby the colour fields create a deep dialogue with the architecture and de-materialise the space.

== Gallery ==
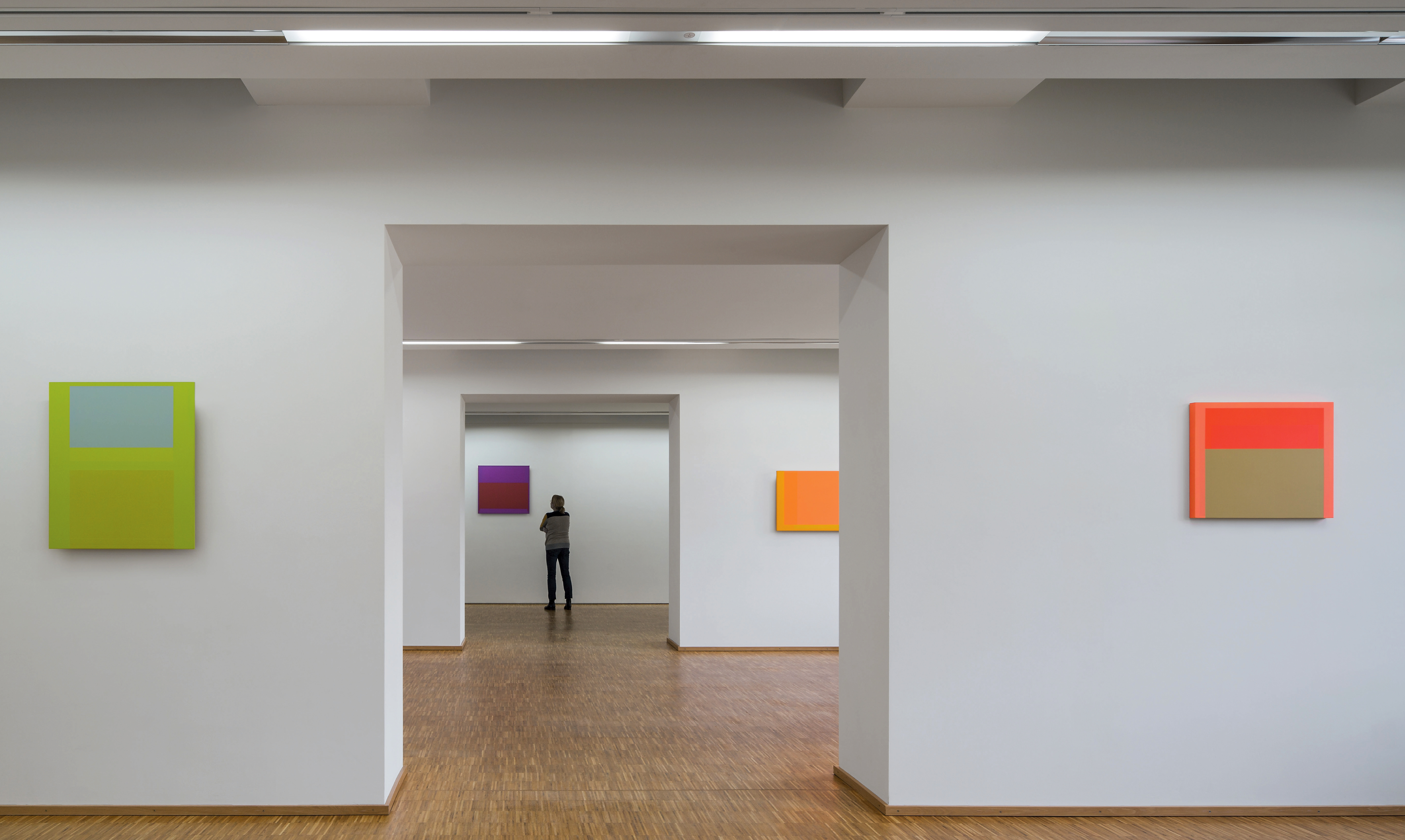
Städtische Galerie Offenburg, 2013

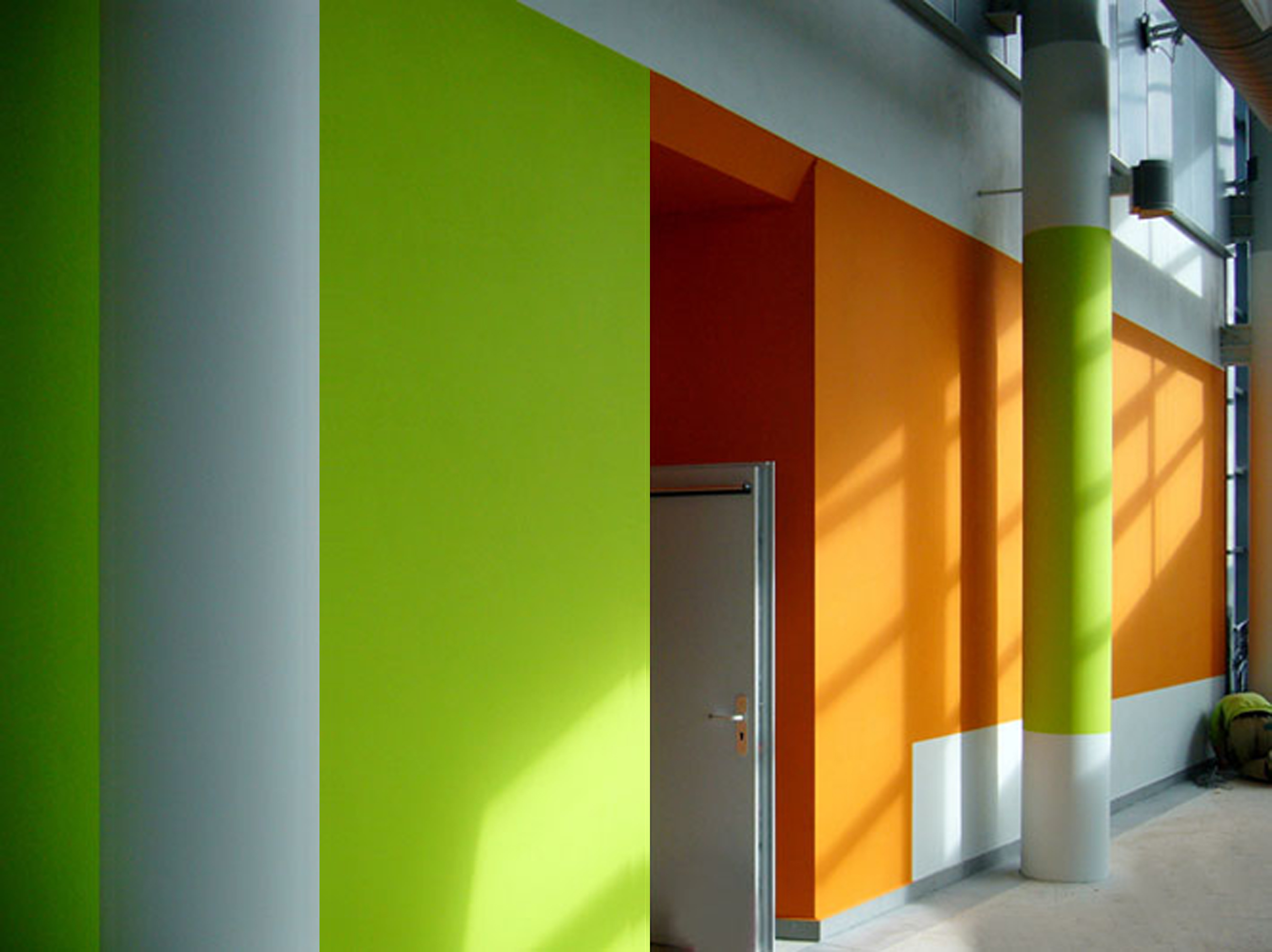
Kunst am Bau Flughafen Köln-Wahn, 2009

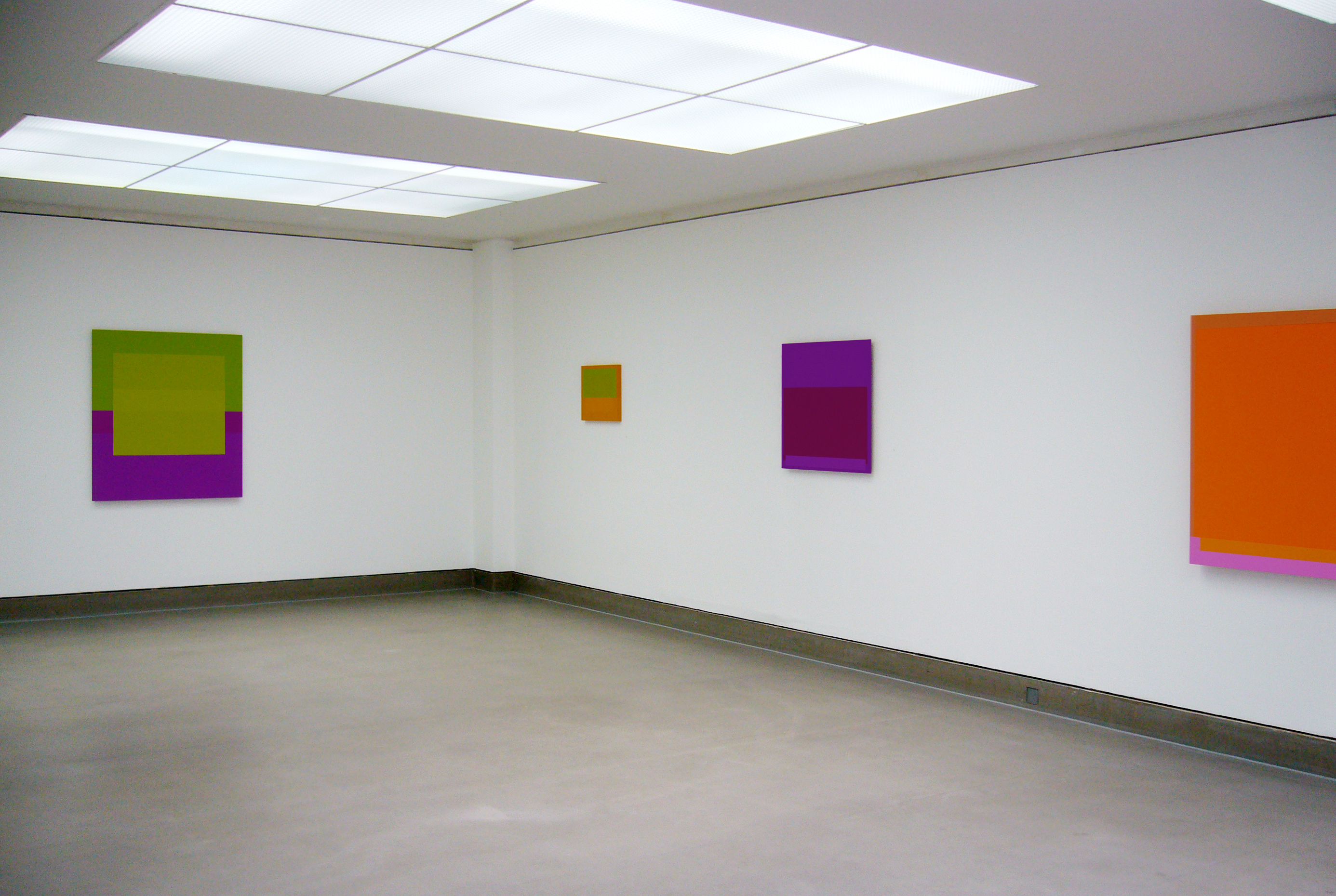
Gesellschaft für Kunst und Gestaltung Bonn, 2010

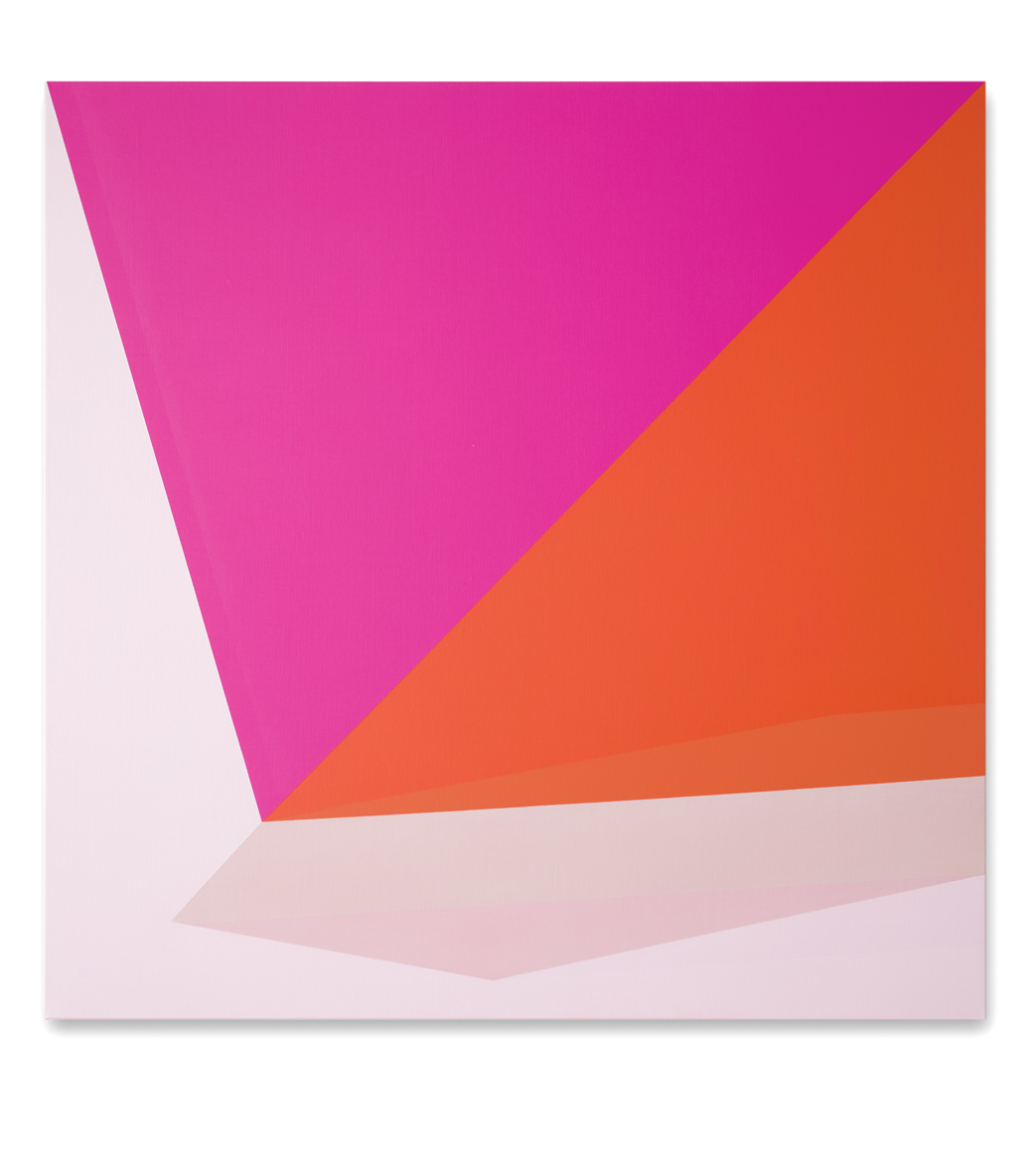
Gebeugtes Feld 120 x 120 cm

== Exhibitions ==
=== Solo exhibitions ===
- 2019 Sabine Funke. wie gemalt. Galerie Rottloff, Karlsruhe English/German
- 2013 FARBE. sabine funke; Städtische Galerie Offenburg; Städt. Galerie Offenburg (ed.). Karlsruhe/Engelhardt & Bauer (publisher), ISBN 978-3-941850-49-1. English/ German
- 2009 Sabine Funke: diafan; Städtische Galerie Karlsruhe; Förderkreis Städtische Galerie Karlsruhe (ed.); Karlsruhe/Engelhardt & Bauer (publisher). English/German
- 2006 Sabine Funke, Gemälde. Struktur. Ein Raum für Luis Barragán. Josef Albers Museum Quadrat Bottrop ( ed.); Karlsruhe/Engelhardt & Bauer (publisher), d-nb.info/980384737.
- 2005 Sabine Funke Hannah Nagel Preisträgerin, cella; Badischer Kunstverein (ed.); Info Verlag GmbH LINDEMANNS BIBLIOTHEK (publisher).
- 1997 Sabine Funke, Tafelbilder und Papierarbeiten, raum für kunst, Frankfurt/M. und Galerie Rottloff (ed.), Karlsruhe; Karlsruhe/Engelhardt & Bauer (publisher).
- 1994 Sabine Funke Farbe : Dominikanerkloster Frankfurt am Main, Galerie Tilo Ruppert (ed.), Landau/ Ev. Regionalverband Frankfurt/Main; d-nb.info/950831972.
- 1991 Sabine Funke, Lichtschichten und Schattenräume, Badischer Kunstverein Karlsruhe (ed.); Karlsruhe/Engelhardt & Bauer (publisher), ISBN 3-89309-050-9.
- 1987 Sabine Funke : Wandskulpturen, Kunsthalle Mannheim; Städtische Kunsthalle Mannheim (ed.); Arbeitskreis Stadtzeichner Alsfeld, ISBN 3891650396.
- 1984 Sabine Funke, in-an, Objekte und Collagen, Kunsthalle Bielefeld 1984 (ed.), Bielefeld, Selbstverlag (publisher).

=== Group exhibitions and art-in-architecture ===
- BUX FUNKE FUX, Galerie Rottloff, Karlsruhe, Germany, 2025.
- Sammlung². Museumszentrum Quadrat, Bottrop, Germany, 2024.
- Kunst am Bau: Projekte des Bundes 2006-2013 ISBN 978-3868592467 Naturschutz, Bau und Reaktorsicherheit Bundesministerium für Umwelt (ed.); Jovis Berlin (24. Juni 2014/ publisher).
- 30 Jahre gkg 1982 - 2012 : Katalog anlässlich des 30jährigen Jubiläums der Gesellschaft für Kunst und Gestaltung 2014; Gesellschaft für Kunst und Gestaltung e. V. (publisher), Bonn; ISBN 978-3-00-040906-6
- chroma – Malerei der neunziger Jahre. Sabine Funke, Katharina Grosse, Susanne Paesler, Vero Pfeiffer, ap-picts-A.Pfisterer, Frances Scholz und Corinne Wasmuth, 1999, Kunsthalle Nürnberg (ed.).
- Schwerpunkte Skulptur und Papier: Eine Auswahl von Neuerwerbungen der Kunsthalle Mannheim seit 1983 : Stadtische Kunsthalle Mannheim 1990; Städtische Kunsthalle Mannheim (ed.); ISBN 3891650647.
- Standpunkte - Blickpunkte : 19 junge Bildhauer in Deutschland 1984/85; Skulpturenpark Seestern, Düsseldorf; Hans Albert [ed.] Peters (Author)
- Neue Kunst aus Frankfurt 1983, Frankfurter Kunstverein, Steinernes Haus am Römerberg, Frankfurt am Main; Peter Weiermaier (ed.).
