= Rainer Funke =

German politician (born 1940)

Member of the Bundestag
- In office 4 November 1980 – 29 March 1983
- In office 18 February 1987 – 18 October 2005

Personal details
- Born: 18 November 1940 Berlin
- Party: FDP

Rainer Funke (born 18 November 1940) is a German politician of the Free Democratic Party (FDP) and former member of the German Bundestag.

== Life ==
He was a member of the German Bundestag from 1980 to 1983 and again from 1987 to 2005. After the 1990 parliamentary elections, Funke was appointed Parliamentary State Secretary to the Federal Minister of Justice in the Federal Government led by Chancellor Helmut Kohl on 24 January 1991.

== Literature ==
Herbst, Ludolf; Jahn, Bruno (2002). Vierhaus, Rudolf (ed.). Biographisches Handbuch der Mitglieder des Deutschen Bundestages. 1949–2002 [Biographical Handbook of the Members of the German Bundestag. 1949–2002] (in German). München: De Gruyter - De Gruyter Saur. p. 1715. ISBN 978-3-11-184511-1.
