= National Register of Historic Places listings in Jefferson Davis Parish, Louisiana =

Location of Jefferson Davis Parish in Louisiana

This is a list of the National Register of Historic Places listings in Jefferson Davis Parish, Louisiana.

This is intended to be a complete list of the properties on the National Register of Historic Places in Jefferson Davis Parish, Louisiana, United States. The locations of National Register properties for which the latitude and longitude coordinates are included below, may be seen in a map.

There are 18 properties listed on the National Register in the parish, and one former listing.

This National Park Service list is complete through NPS recent listings posted October 23, 2026.

== Current listings ==
	Name on the Register	Image	Date listed	Location	City or town	Description
1	Angelus	Angelus	April 16, 1993 (#93000296)	1114 North Cutting Avenue; 30°13′53″N 92°39′16″W	Jennings	
2	Calkins-Orvis House	Calkins-Orvis House	May 8, 1998 (#98000438)	210 West Nichols Street; 30°14′06″N 92°49′24″W	Welsh	
3	Camp Hamilton House		February 17, 2004 (#04000072)	2200 East Academy Avenue; 30°13′53″N 92°38′02″W	Jennings	
4	Derouen House		August 5, 1991 (#91001021)	214 West Plaquemine Street; 30°13′22″N 92°39′36″W	Jennings	
5	Elton United Methodist Church	Elton United Methodist Church	September 30, 1994 (#94001174)	803 2nd Street; 30°28′44″N 92°41′31″W	Elton	
6	Silas J. Fenton House		October 7, 1994 (#94001200)	409 2nd Street; 30°21′49″N 92°55′10″W	Fenton	
7	J.E. Foster House		September 30, 1994 (#94001175)	314 West Academy Avenue; 30°13′29″N 92°39′40″W	Jennings	
8	Funk House		April 1, 1993 (#93000267)	523 North Cary Avenue; 30°13′32″N 92°39′34″W	Jennings	
9	Ilgenhurst		April 1, 1993 (#93000273)	402 West Nezpique Street; 30°13′25″N 92°39′42″W	Jennings	
10	F.R. Jaenke House		April 16, 1993 (#93000301)	114 East Shankland Avenue; 30°13′56″N 92°39′26″W	Jennings	Also known as Miguez Funeral Homes.
11	Jennings Carnegie Public Library	Jennings Carnegie Public Library	January 8, 1982 (#82002776)	303 North Cary Avenue; 30°13′22″N 92°39′34″W	Jennings	
12	Jennings Post Office	Jennings Post Office	May 20, 1982 (#82002777)	118 West Plaquemine Street; 30°13′22″N 92°39′32″W	Jennings	
13	T. C. Mahaffey House	T. C. Mahaffey House	April 8, 1993 (#93000292)	802 North Cary Avenue; 30°13′39″N 92°39′32″W	Jennings	
14	More Mileage Gas Station	More Mileage Gas Station	June 22, 2004 (#04000637)	602 North Main Street; 30°13′32″N 92°39′28″W	Jennings	
15	S.A. Pennington House	S.A. Pennington House	October 7, 1994 (#94001199)	1003 2nd Street; 30°28′44″N 92°41′42″W	Elton	
16	Strand Theatre	Strand Theatre	November 12, 1998 (#98001360)	432 North Main Street; 30°13′27″N 92°39′28″W	Jennings	Moderne style theatre built in 1939
17	True Friends Benevolent Association #1		October 23, 2026 (#100013574)	507 Azalea Street; 30°14′17″N 92°44′40″W	Roanoke	
18	Twitchell House	Twitchell House	April 1, 1993 (#93000268)	803 North Cary Avenue; 30°13′40″N 92°39′34″W	Jennings	

== Former listings ==
	Name on the Register	Image	Date listed	Date removed	Location	City or town	Description
1	Fruge Store		September 30, 1994 (#94001176)	November 29, 2016	907 Main Street; 30°28′52″N 92°41′38″W	Elton	Building demolished some time between 1994 and 2016.
2	Sunny Meade		April 18, 1985 (#85000837)	June 12, 2017	819 North Cary Avenue; 30°13′40″N 92°39′32″W	Jennings	Building moved to 230 Topeka Road, Scott, Lafayette Parish in 1989 and now being used as a wedding facility.

== See also ==
- List of National Historic Landmarks in Louisiana
- National Register of Historic Places listings in Louisiana
