= Funke Digital TV =

- Company type: Public company
- Industry: Consumer Electronics
- Founded: 1957
- Founder: Mr. J. Baaijens
- Headquarters: Boxtel, Netherlands
- Area served: Global
- Products: Consumer Electronics; Antenna (TV and radio)
- Owner: Mr. S. Baaijens (CEO)
- Website: www.funkedigital.de

Funke Digital TV (formerly known as "Funke Antennen") is a digital television products supplier, stationed in Boxtel, Netherlands. Currently, Funke Digital TV delivers mainly DTT antennas (indoor, outdoor, automotive and portable) to various countries around the globe, including the Netherlands, Russia, Germany, Norway, Sweden, Finland, Denmark, United Kingdom, Ireland, Belgium, Austria, Portugal, Spain, Italy, France, Greece, Ukraine and various countries in Africa.
