= Jennings Carnegie Public Library =

- U.S. National Register of Historic Places
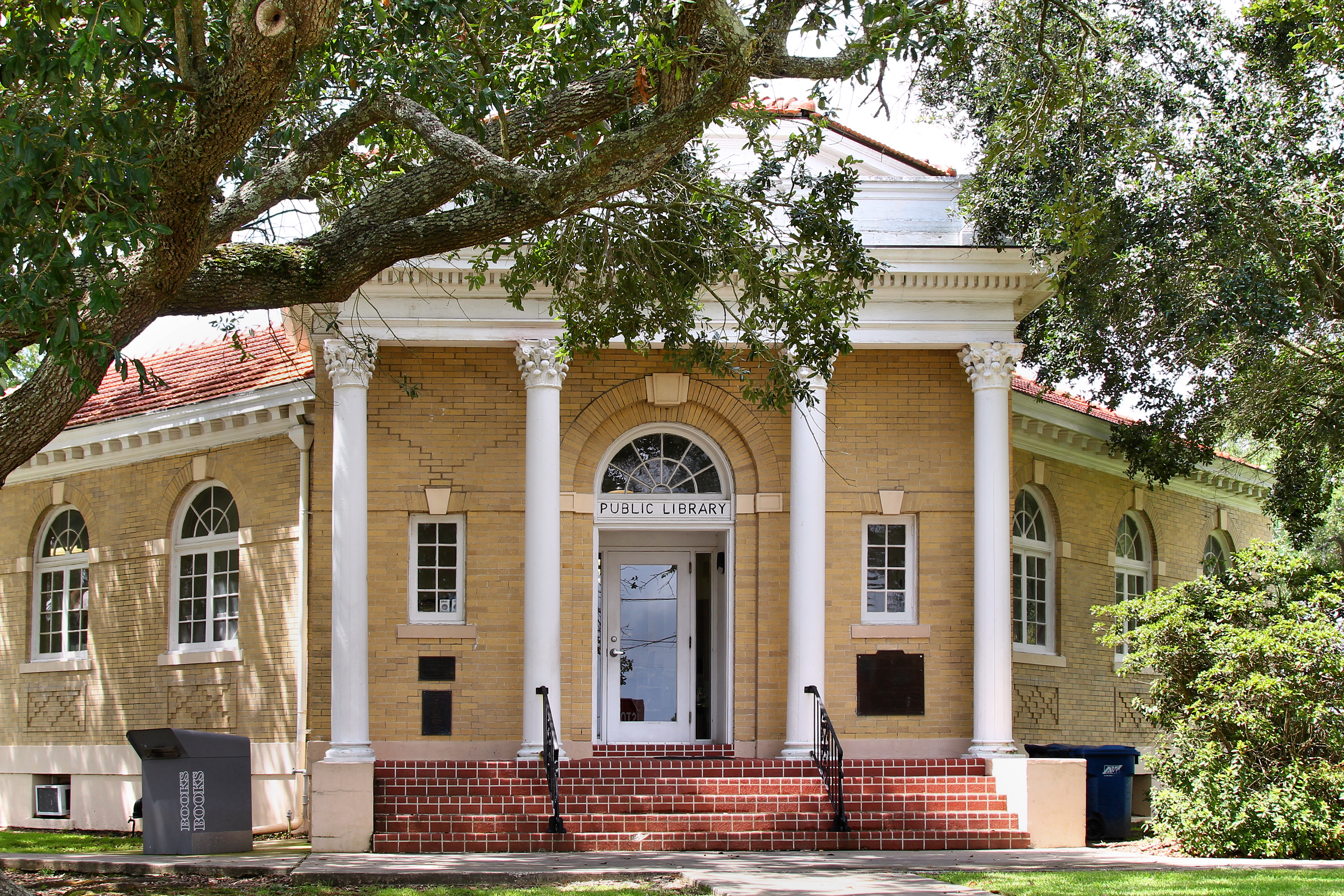

- Location within Louisiana Location within the United States
- Location: 303 North Cary Avenue, Jennings, Louisiana
- Coordinates: 30°13′22″N 92°39′34″W
- Area: 0.12 acres (0.049 ha)
- Built: 1908
- Architect: Whitfield & King
- Architectural style: Palladian
- NRHP reference No.: 82002776
- Added to NRHP: January 8, 1982

The Jennings Carnegie Public Library is a Carnegie library located at 303 North Cary Avenue in Jennings, Louisiana.

It is operated by the City of Jennings.

The library was listed on the National Register of Historic Places on January 8, 1982.

== History ==
The Jennings Carnegie Public Library is the oldest established library in the state of Louisiana. In 1889 the Jennings Ladies' Library Association opened the first public library in Jennings, Louisiana. The first structure burned down in 1901, leading the association to purchase the site and request financial support for a new library from the Carnegie Library program. With a donation of $10,000 and the city providing funding, support, and maintenance, the women were allowed to proceed with the project. The new building was built in 1908.

== Architecture ==
The new building was built in 1908 with buff brick with white woodwork trim, and is located on a corner lot on the edge of the business district of Jennings. The main entrance is into a domed octagonal rotunda at the corner of the V-shaped building, with four Corinthian columns topped by a full entablature and a parapet beneath the dome. It is Palladian or Italian Renaissance architecture, designed by New York City architects Whitfield & King.

It was remodeled in 1952 and the south wing of the building was extended by four bays, with compatible brickwork and details.

== Collections ==
The Jennings Carnegie Public Library has a number of collections.

- The Historic Jennings Photo Collection
  - A large collection of photos from Jennings McComb
- The Birth of Jennings
  - A three-volume collection of historical pictures and articles by Walter D. Morse
- The Morse Collection
  - A collection of shells, photographs, and other historical items from L.L. Morse
- The Jennings Newspaper Collection
  - Jennings newspapers dating from 1894
- The Ron Wilkinson Postcard Collection
  - A donated collection of postcards from a native of Jennings, Ron Wilkinson
- The High School and College Yearbook Collection
  - A collection of Jennings high school yearbooks from various years

== See also ==
- National Register of Historic Places listings in Jefferson Davis Parish, Louisiana
