= Funk (surname) =

Funk is a German surname.

== People with the surname ==
- Aaron Funk, Canadian electronic musician
- Allan Funk, American professional wrestler
- Annie Clemmer Funk (1874–1912), Mennonite missionary in India, perished with the Titanic
- Casimir Funk (1884–1967), Polish biochemist
- The Funk family of American professional wrestlers:
  - Dory Funk (1919–1973), family patriarch
  - Dory Funk Jr. (born 1942), real-life older son
  - Terry Funk (1944–2023), real-life younger son also known as "The Funker"
  - Jimmy Jack Funk (born 1959), kayfabe younger son (real name Ferrin Barr Jr.)
- Eric Funk (born 1949), American contemporary classical composer
- Florian Funk (born 1998), German politician
- Franz Xaver von Funk (1840–1907), German church historian
- Fred Funk (born 1956), American professional golfer
- Friedrich Funk (1900–1963), German politician
- Håkan Funk (born 1962), Swedish curler
- Heinrich Funk (1807-1877), German landscape painter
- Isaac Funk (1797-1865), American politician, pioneer and rancher
- Isaac Kaufmann Funk (1839–1912), American editor, lexicographer, publisher and spelling reformer
- Jake Funk (born 1998), American football player
- Joe Funk (c.1914–1981), American lithography printmaker and muralist.
- John B. Funk (1905–1993), American politician from Maryland
- John F. Funk (1835–1930), American religious leader
- Joseph Funk (1778–1862), American music teacher and publisher
- Michael Funk, Canadian ice hockey player
- Neil Funk (born 1946), American basketball announcer Chicago Bulls (1991-2020)
- Nolan Gerard Funk (born 1986), Canadian actor
- Paul Funk (1886–1969), Austrian mathematician
- Paul E. Funk (born 1940), American general
- Paul E. Funk II (born 1962), American general
- Robert W. Funk (1926–2005), American religious scholar
- Rydel Funk (née Lynch) (born 1993), American singer, musician and television actress, member of pop rock band R5
- Tom Funk, American Major League baseball player
- Vicki Funk (1947–2019), American botanist and curator
- Wally Funk (1939–2026), American aviator and Goodwill Ambassador
- Walther Funk (1890–1960), Nazi official
- Wes Funk (1969-2015), Canadian writer
- Wilfred John Funk (1883–1965), American author and publisher, son of Isaac Kaufmann Funk
- Wilhelm Heinrich Funk (1866–1949), German-American portrait painter
- Wolf-Peter Funk (1943–2021), German-Canadian religious scholar and Coptologist
