= Jaromír Funke =

Czech photographer (1896–1945)

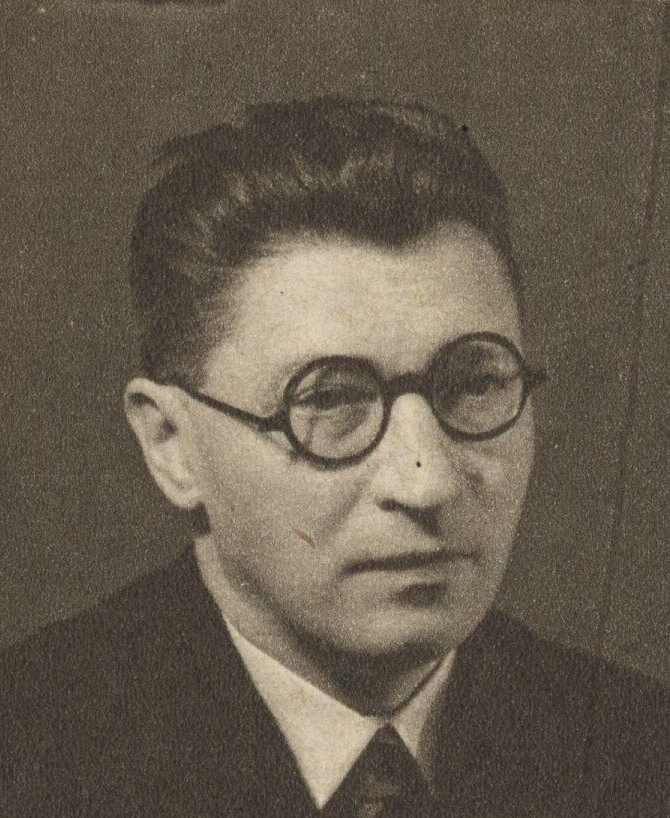
Jaromír Funke

Jaromír Funke (1 August 1896 – 22 March 1945) was a leading Czech photographer during the 1920s and 1930s.

== Early life ==
Funke was born to a wealthy family in house No. 238 in Skuteč on 1 August 1896, the son of Antonín Funke, Bohemian-German lawyer (son of Josef Funke, a Kolín draper) and his wife Miloslava, the daughter of Professor František Potůček. He studied medicine at Prague University, and law and philosophy at the Charles University in Prague and the university of Bratislava but did not graduate and instead turned to photography.

== Style ==
Funke was recognized for his “photographic games” using mirrors, lights, and insignificant objects, such as plates, bottles, or glasses, to create unique works. In his still life imagery he created abstracts of forms and shadows reminiscent of photograms. His work was regarded as logical, original and expressive in nature. A typical feature of his work would be the “dynamic diagonal."

== Career ==
=== Later career ===
During his photography profession, Funke published editorials and critiques about photography. By 1922, Funke had become a skilled freelance photographer and two years later he, Josef Sudek and Adolf Schneeberger created the Czech Photographic Society. From 1931 to 1935, Funke headed the photography department at the School of Arts and Crafts in Bratislava. Soon after, Funke taught at the School of Graphic Art in Prague until 1944. Alongside Ladislav Sutha, the director of the previous school, Funke published Fotografie vidí povrch in 1935. While travelling, Funke became interested in politically engaged photography and was a contributor to the illustrated weekly Pestrý týden. Bad living, created during the Great Depression of 1930–1931, dealt with poverty. Funke later became an editor of the journal Fotografický obzor ("Photographic Horizons") for several years. He published a number of works including Od fotogramu k emoci which is understood to be his manifesto.

== Death ==
As travelling was limited during World War II in 1939, Funke photographed close to home in Louny, Prague and sometimes Kolín. On March 22, 1945, in Kolin, a few months before the end of the Second World War and its indirect victim as a result of the Allied airstrike, the electricity supply to the hospital in which he was under abdominal surgery was interrupted, and he died. He was buried at the Central Cemetery in Kolín.

== Bibliography ==
- Dufek Antonín: Jaromír Funke. Průkopník fotografické avantgardy, 1997, Brno, ISBN 80-7027-061-6
- Ludvík Souček: Jaromír Funke - Fotografie, 1970, Odeon, Prague
- Československý biografický slovník, Encyklopedický institut ČSAV, Academia, Praha, 1992
- Pastor Suzanne E., Dufek Antonín: Jaromír Funke - fotografie 1919-1943 - věci skleněné a obyčejné, Pražský dům fotografie, Praha, 1995
- Birgus V. a kol.: Česká fotografická avantgarda 1918-1948, Kant, Praha, 1999
- Philippe Grand: Vues d' architectures - photographies des XIXe et XXe siecles, 2002, Réunion des Musées Nationaux, Paris, France
- Moucha Josef: A flash of avant-garde, or Jaromír Funke, Imago, n. 18, Summer 2004
- Dufek Antonín: Jaromír Funke, fotografická publikace, Torst, 2004
- Witkovsky, Matthew S.: Jaromír Funke's Abstract Photo series of 1927–1929: History in the making, in: History of Photography 29 (2015) 3, S. 228–239.

== Collections ==
- Jaromir Funke in the Getty
- Jaromir Funke in the Howard Greenberg Gallery
- Jaromir Funke in the Metropolitan Museum of Art
- Jaromir Funke in the Museum of Fine Arts, Boston
- Jaromir Funke in the Museum of Fine Arts, Houston
- Jaromir Funke in the Museum of Modern Art
- Jaromir Funke in the National Gallery of Art

== Exhibitions ==
- Jaromír Funke and the Amateur Avant-Garde, National Gallery of Art, Washington, D. C., May 3 - August 9, 2009
- Jaromír Funke and Avant-garde Photography in Czechoslovakia 1900–1950, Kumu Art Museum, Tallinn, May 15 – August 30, 2015
- Jaromír Funke: Photographer of the Avant-Garde, Leica Gallery, Prague, November 25, 2016 - January 29, 2017. Later exhibited at Fotografie Forum Frankfurt
