= Funk House (Jennings, Louisiana) =

Historic house in Louisiana, United States

- U.S. National Register of Historic Places
- Location within Louisiana Location within the United States
- Location: 523 North Cary Avenue, Jennings, Louisiana
- Coordinates: 30°13′32″N 92°39′34″W
- Area: less than one acre
- Built: c.1895
- Architectural style: Queen Anne, Eastlake
- NRHP reference No.: 93000267
- Added to NRHP: April 1, 1993

The Funk House, located at 523 North Cary Avenue in Jennings, Louisiana, is a historic house with elements of Queen Anne and Eastlake architectural styles.

Built in about 1895, it is notable for reflecting the Midwest origins of the people of the town, in its relative verticality and minimal porches, and for "some of the very finest Eastlake ornamentation to survive in Jennings" in its porches and front window. The porches and front window "feature richly three dimensional ornamentation, including scroll and curved brackets, ball drops, cut out designs, and scallops. Although small elements, these make quite an architectural statement."

The house was listed on the National Register of Historic Places on April 1, 1993.

== See also ==
- National Register of Historic Places listings in Jefferson Davis Parish, Louisiana
