= Otto Funke =

German physiologist

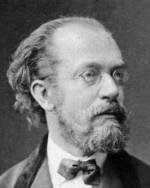
Otto Funke

Otto Funke (October 27, 1828 – August 17, 1879) was a German physiologist born in Chemnitz.

He studied in Leipzig and Heidelberg, and in 1852, he became a lecturer of physiology at the University of Leipzig. In 1853, he became an associate professor to the medical faculty at Leipzig, and in 1860, a professor of physiology at the University of Freiburg. One of his better known students at Leipzig was the physiologist Karl Ewald Konstantin Hering (1834–1918).

In 1851, Otto Funke was the first scientist to successfully crystallize hemoglobin (German: Hämoglobinkristalle), which he first called Blutfarbstoff. This work was a precursor to Felix Hoppe-Seyler's important studies of hemoglobin. Funke also performed research of blood formation in the spleen, and investigations into the effects of curare.

== Selected publications ==
- Lehrbuch der Physiologie (7. Aufl. von Grünhagen, Hamburg 1884)
- Atlas der physiologischen Chemie (Leipzig 1853, 2. Aufl. 1858), Supplement to Carl Lehmann's Lehrbuch der physiologischen Chemie
- Kapitel über den Tastsinn und die Gemeingefühle. In: Ludimar Hermann's Handbuch der Physiologie (Bd. 3, Leipzig 1880)
