= Funk House (Olympia, Washington) =

Historic house in Washington, United States

- U.S. National Register of Historic Places
- Location within Washington (state)
- Location: 1202 E. Olympia Ave., Olympia, Washington
- Coordinates: 47°2′53″N 122°53′14″W
- Area: less than one acre
- Built: 1892
- Architectural style: Late Victorian
- NRHP reference No.: 87000691
- Added to NRHP: May 08, 1987

The Funk House is located at 1202 Olympia Avenue NE in Olympia, Washington. The house was built in 1892 in the Queen Anne style for Brad and Ann Davis.
