= Josef Sudek =

Czech photographer (1896–1976)

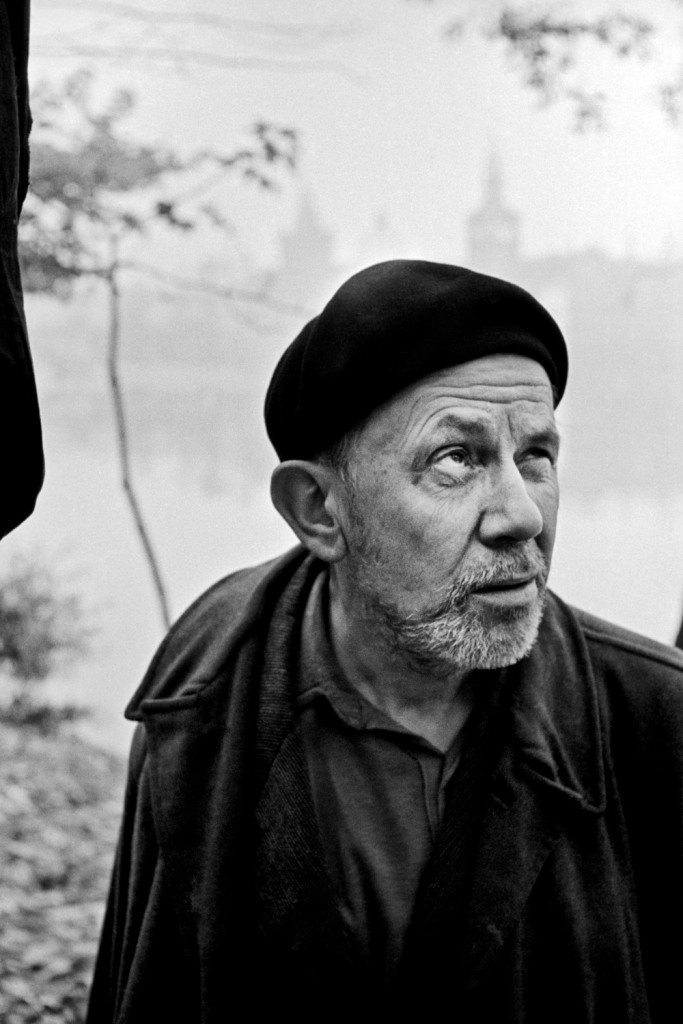
Josef Sudek in 1958

Josef Sudek (17 March 1896 – 15 September 1976) was a Czech photographer, best known for his photographs of Prague.

== Life ==
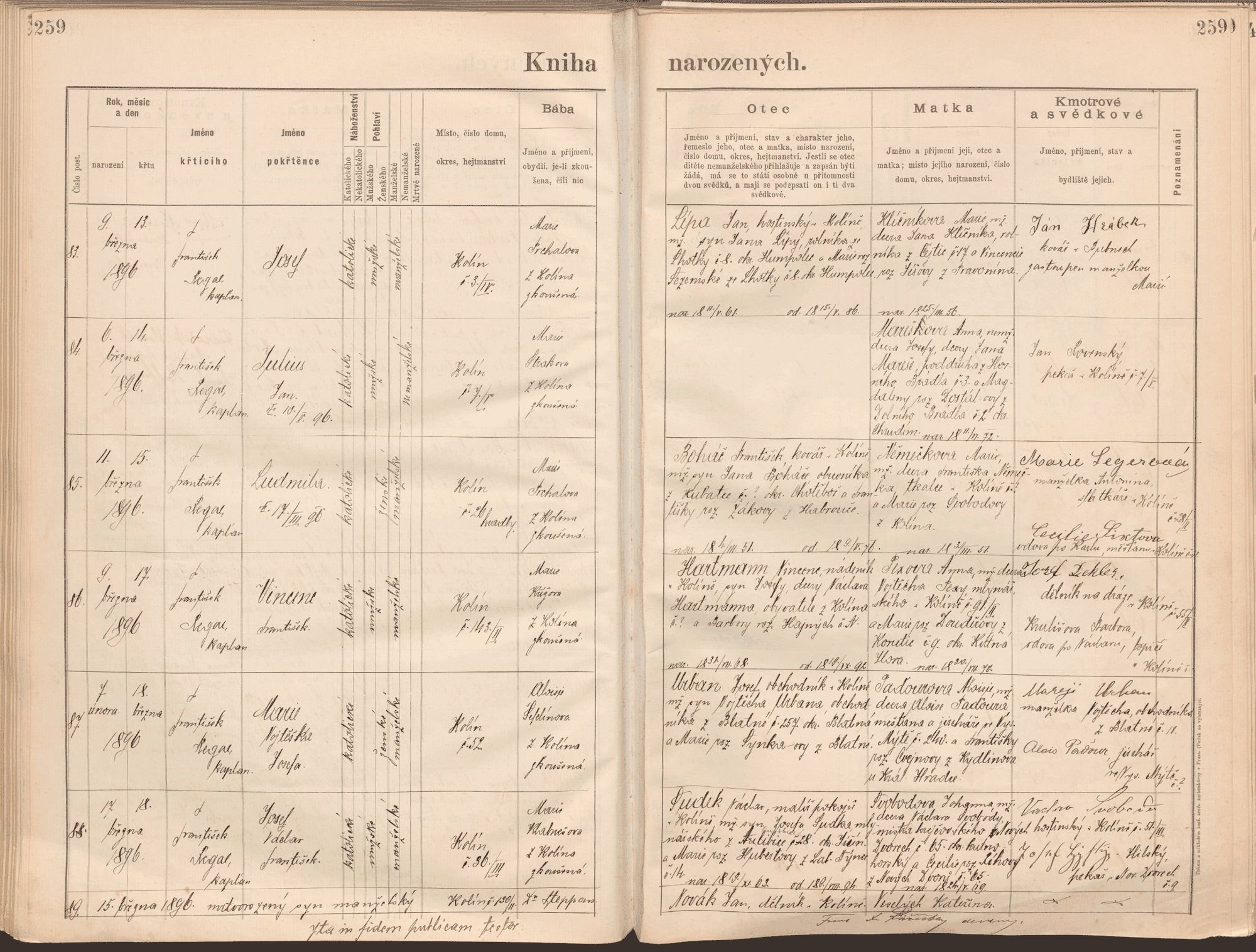
Josef Sudek birth record 1896

Sudek was born in Kolín, Bohemia. Before the first world war he trained as a bookbinder and was an amateur photographer. During the First World War he was drafted into the Austro-Hungarian Army in 1915 and served on the Italian Front until he was wounded in the right arm in 1916 which led to the limb being amputated at the shoulder. After the war he took up photography more seriously, and befriended Jaromír Funke and Adolf Schneeberger. He studied photography for two years in Prague under Karel Novák from 1922 to 1924. Together, Schneeberger, Funke, and Sudek founded the Czech Photographic Society (1924-1936). His army disability pension and some inheritance gave him leeway to make art, and he worked during the 1920s in the romantic Pictorialist style. Always pushing at the boundaries, a local camera club expelled him for arguing about the need to move forwards from 'painterly' photography. Despite only having one arm, he used large, bulky cameras, sometimes with the aid of an assistant.

Sudek's photography is sometimes said to be modernist. But this is only true of a couple of years in the 1930s, during which he undertook commercial photography, including contributions to the illustrated Prague weekly Pestrý týden and thus worked "in the style of the times". Primarily, his personal photography is neo-romantic.

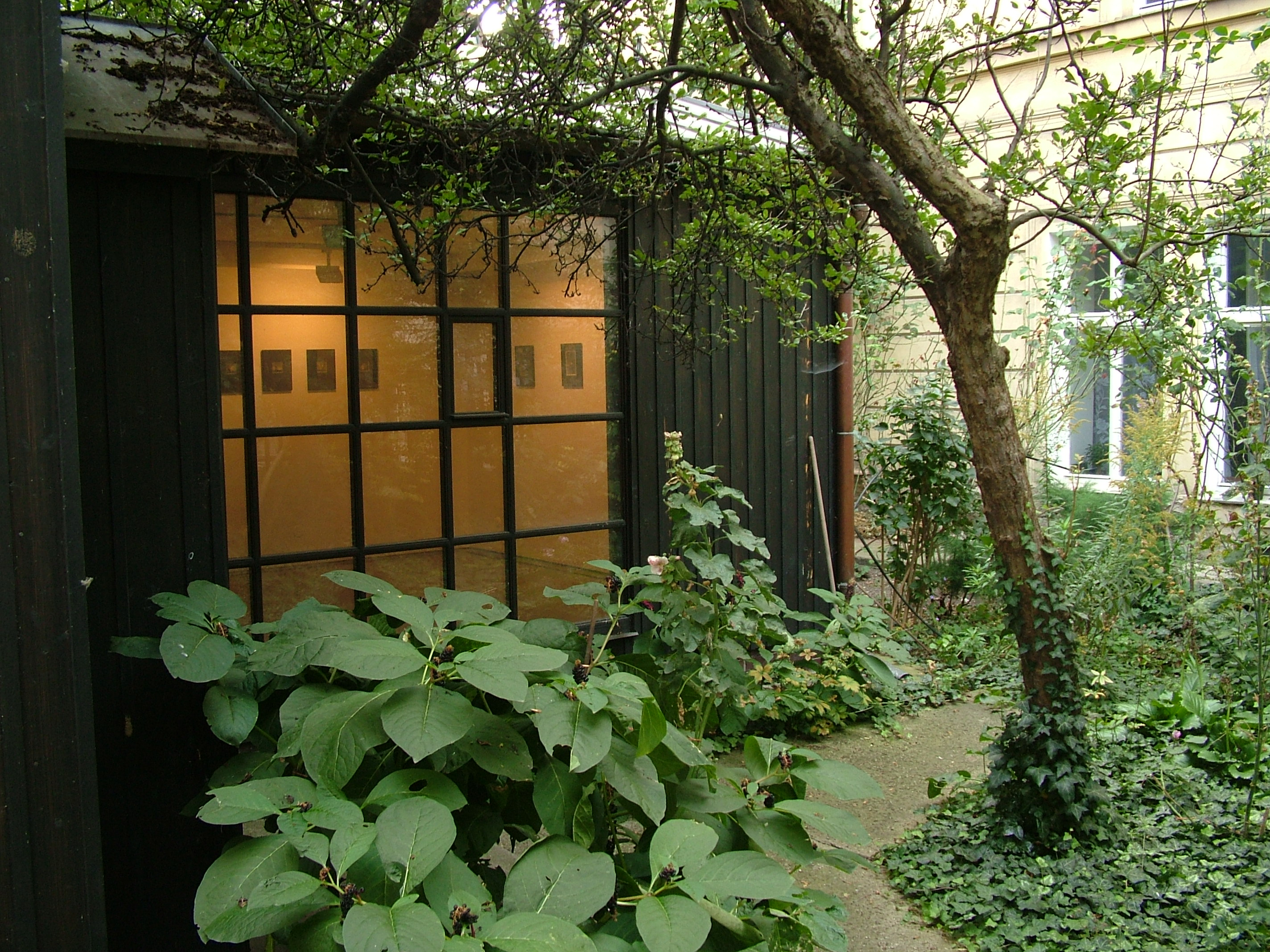
Sudek's restored atelier in Prague – Újezd

His first commercial and critical success in publishing was the 1928 book on St. Vitus Cathedral, a book of photographs of the cathedral made during the final years of its construction. During and after World War II Sudek created haunting night-scapes and panoramas of Prague, photographed the wooded landscape of Bohemia, and the window-glass that led to his garden (the famous The Window of My Atelier series). He went on to photograph the crowded interior of his studio (the Labyrinths series).

His work was first exhibited in the United States in Five Photographers at the Sheldon Museum of Art at the University of Nebraska/Lincoln in 1968. The George Eastman House presented Josef Sudek, A Retrospective Exhibition in 1974.

He published 16 books during his life.

Known as the "Poet of Prague", Sudek never married, and was a shy, retiring person. He never appeared at his exhibit openings and few people appear in his photographs. Despite the privations of the war and Communism, he kept a renowned record collection of classical music.

In recent years, his work has frequently been reproduced in books, making his work some of the most readily accessible to those interested in twentieth-century Czech photography.

In 1984 Sudek was posthumously inducted into the International Photography Hall of Fame and Museum.

== Sudek in literature ==
In addition to conventional biographies of Sudek, John Banville's Prague Pictures: Portraits of a City introduces the reader to the city through the photographic lens of Joseph Sudek. Banville relates how he became enlisted to smuggle Sudek's photographs to the United States and through his tale and the story of Sudek muses on the history of Prague in its gravity and melancholy, torn by war and oppression. He re-creates the anxiety that must have faced the photographer in a city where, under Nazi occupation, landscape photography could be a mortal offense.

Sudek was used as a symbolic presence in Howard Norman's novel Devotion. The protagonist, David Kozol, was a photographer and mentored under Sudek. David Kozol remarks on the melancholy that pervaded Sudek's work and a similar mood persists through the novel. Sudek figures symbolically in the novel; David Kozol's mother in law worked as a book binder and it was through apprenticeship to a book binder that Sudek became interested in photography. The characters seem to be symbolically injured or emotionally broken like the one armed Sudek and visual imagery figures prominently.

In 2006 the Dutch poet Hans Tentije published a bundle containing the poem: "Met Josef Sudek op weg door Praag", "On my way through Prague with Sudek". In nine parts the poet "helps" Sudek with his photography.

== Books ==
=== Select monographs ===
- Fotografie. Prague: Státní Nakladatelství Krásné Literatury, Hudby a Uméní, 1956.
- Praha Panoramatická [Prague Panoramic]. Prague: Státní Nakladatelství Krásné Literatury, Hudby a Uméní, 1959. 284 panoramic photographs of Prague and environs with an introductory poem by Jaroslav Seifert.
- Karlův Most: Ve Fotografii [The Charles Bridge in Photographs]. Prague: Státní Nakladatelství, 1961. 160 photographs of Charles Bridge, with an introduction by art historian Emanuel Poche and two introductory poems by Jaroslav Seifert.
- Janacek-Hukvaldy, Praha: Supraphon, 1971 Photographs of Hukvaldy, birthplace of Czech composer Leoš Janáček.
- Smutna Krajina: Severozapadni Cechy 1957-1962 [Sad Landscape: Northwest Bohemia 1957-1962], Gallery of Fine Art, Litomerice, 1999.

== See also ==
- Josef Sudek Gallery
- 4176 Sudek (asteroid name for him)
- The Josef Sudek Studio
