= Funcke =

Funcke is a surname. Notable people with the surname include:

- Friedrich Funcke (1642–1699), German composer
- Liselotte Funcke (1918–2012), German liberal politician, vice president of federal parliament, state Minister of Economy in North Rhine-Westphalia, Federal Commissioner for Foreigners
- Oscar Funcke (1885–1965), German politician
- Ross Funcke (born 1977), Australian rules footballer
