= Jan Tesař (historian) =

Czech historian and writer (1933–2025)

- Born: 2 June 1933; Skuteč, Czechoslovakia
- Died: 16 June 2025 (aged 92); Skuteč, Czechia
- Occupations: Historian; writer

Jan Tesař (2 June 1933 – 16 June 2025) was a Czech historian and writer who was a dissident in the times of communist Czechoslovakia.

== Life and career ==
Tesař was born in Skuteč on 2 June 1933. After having pursued studies in history at the Faculty of Arts of Charles University in Prague, he joined the Military Historical Institute in 1956. Expelled from that institution in 1958 for political reasons, he spent two years without a steady position and worked as an independent researcher before finally obtaining a position at the Museum of Pardubice. In 1961, he joined the Military Historical Institute once again. He became a member of the Communist Party in 1966 but resigned his membership in 1969. He was one of the founders of the Committee for the Defense of the Unjustly Prosecuted (VONS), a signatory of Charter 77, and promoter of the meetings between Czech and Polish dissidents in the Giant Mountains. From 1977, he was the editor of the dissident magazine Dialogy. In 1980, he left Czechoslovakia and initially went to Germany, only to later settle in France where he continued his political activities. After 1989, he took part in several academic and political initiatives concerning democratization.

Tesař lived in Slovakia. He died on 16 June 2025, at the age of 92.

== Archives on the History of Czechoslovak Dissent ==
As a historian well trained in archival work, Tesař has left two important collections that concern the history of the Czechoslovak dissident movement. One of them is currently located at the Museum of Moravia, while the other is held in the collections of La contemporaine in France.

== Works ==
- Mnichovský komplex : jeho příčiny a důsledky. Prostor, Prague 2000. 255 p. (ISBN 80-7260-035-4).
- Zamlčená diagnóza. Triáda, Prague 2003. 143 p. (ISBN 80-86138-56-9).
- Traktát o „záchraně národa“ : texty z let 1967-1969 o začátku německé okupace. Triáda, Praha 2006. 381 p. (ISBN 80-86138-67-4).
- Česká cikánská rapsodie. I.-III. volumes. Triáda, Prague 2016. (Volume I. Vzpomínky Josefa Serinka / Jan Tesař, Místo epilogu / Rozhovor s Josefem Ondrou / Dokumenty, 508 pages, (ISBN 978-80-87256-84-8). Volume II. Komentáře ke vzpomínkám Josefa Serinka, 640 pages. Volume III. Mapy, tabulky, diagramy – partyzáni na Vysočině / Jan Tesař, Serinkovské inspirace, 212 pages, (ISBN 978-80-7474-171-5, 978-80-87256-86-2).
- Co počít ve vlkově břiše. Práce o vytváření struktur občanské společnosti 1968–1980. Triáda, Prague 2018. 600 p. (ISBN 978-80-7474-172-2)
- Tesař, Jan (2019). The History of Scientific Atheism: A Comparative Study of Czechoslovakia and Soviet Union (1954-1991). Vandenhoeck & Ruprecht. ISBN 978-3-525-31086-1.
