= 4176 Sudek =

Main-belt asteroid

Discovery
- Discovered by: A. Mrkos
- Discovery site: Kleť Obs.
- Discovery date: 24 February 1987

Designations
- Named after: Josef Sudek (Czech photographer)
- Alternative designations: 1987 DS · 1949 FF_{1} 1952 VC · 1974 TC_{1} 1979 SX_{5} · 1982 FO
- Minor planet category: main-belt · (outer); Themis

Orbital characteristics
- Epoch 23 March 2018 (JD 2458200.5)
- Uncertainty parameter 0
- Observation arc: 64.97 yr (23,731 d)
- Aphelion: 3.5436 AU
- Perihelion: 2.6582 AU
- Semi-major axis: 3.1009 AU
- Eccentricity: 0.1428
- Orbital period (sidereal): 5.46 yr (1,994 d)
- Mean anomaly: 275.67°
- Mean motion: 0° 10^{m} 49.8^{s} / day
- Inclination: 2.5994°
- Longitude of ascending node: 114.33°
- Argument of perihelion: 356.06°

Physical characteristics
- Mean diameter: 14.51±3.83 km 15.86 km (calculated); 17.87±0.77 km 17.96±2.11 km 18.858±0.243 km
- Synodic rotation period: 8.164±0.0092 h
- Geometric albedo: 0.08 (assumed); 0.095±0.019; 0.095±0.033; 0.097±0.009; 0.12±0.11
- Spectral type: C (assumed)
- Absolute magnitude (H): 11.8; 11.90; 11.909±0.002 (R); 12.0; 12.19±0.18; 12.36

4176 Sudek, provisional designation 1987 DS, is a Themistian asteroid from the outer regions of the asteroid belt, approximately 17 kilometers (11 miles) in diameter. It was discovered on 24 February 1987, by Czech astronomer Antonín Mrkos at the Kleť Observatory in the Czech Republic. The presumed C-type asteroid has a rotation period of 8.16 hours. It was named in memory of Czech photographer Josef Sudek.

== Orbit and classification ==
Sudek is a Themistian asteroid that belongs to the Themis family (602), a very large family of carbonaceous asteroids, named after 24 Themis.

It orbits the Sun in the outer main-belt at a distance of 2.7–3.5 AU once every 5 years and 6 months (1,994 days; semi-major axis of 3.1 AU). Its orbit has an eccentricity of 0.14 and an inclination of 3° with respect to the ecliptic. The asteroid was first observed as 1949 FF_{1} at Simeiz Observatory in March 1949. The body's observation arc begins with its observation as 1952 VC at Goethe Link Observatory in November 1952.

=== Occultation ===
On 21 January 2014 Sudek, at magnitude 15.5, occulted the star 2UCAC 39655315 in the constellation Gemini during which the magnitude dropped from 11.8 (star) to 15.5 (asteroid). This event was visible over parts of Japan and China.

== Physical characteristics ==
Sudek is an assumed carbonaceous C-type asteroid, in line with the Themis family's overall spectral type.

=== Rotation period ===
In September 2012, a rotational lightcurve of Sudek was obtained from photometric observations in the R-band by astronomers at the Palomar Transient Factory in California. Lightcurve analysis gave a rotation period of 8.164 hours with a brightness amplitude of 0.32 magnitude (U=2).

=== Diameter and albedo ===
According to the surveys carried out by the Japanese Akari satellite and the NEOWISE mission of NASA's Wide-field Infrared Survey Explorer, Sudek measures between 14.51 and 18.858 kilometers in diameter and its surface has an albedo between 0.095 and 0.12.

The Collaborative Asteroid Lightcurve Link assumes an albedo of 0.08 and calculates a diameter of 15.86 kilometers based on an absolute magnitude of 12.36.

== Naming ==
Based on a proposal by Miloš Tichý, this minor planet was named after Czech photographer Josef Sudek (1896–1976), known for his black-and-white series of still lifes and panoramas of Prague. The official naming citation was published by the Minor Planet Center on 11 February 1998 (M.P.C. 31295).
