= Dita Pepe =

Czech photographer (born 1973)

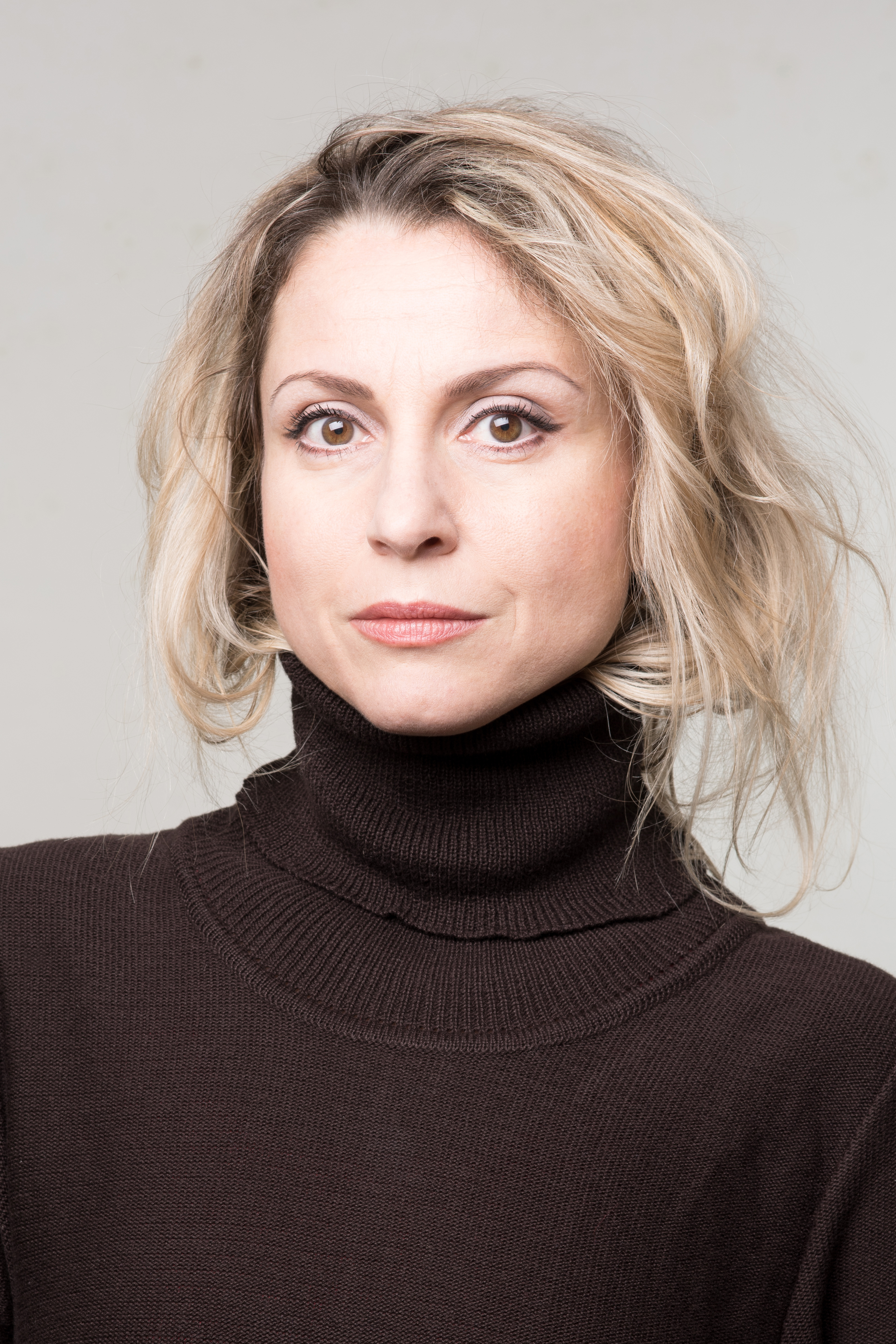
- Dita Pepe in 2017
- Born: Dita Hornsteinerová; 5 September 1973 (age 52); Ostrava, Czechoslovakia
- Education: Silesian University in Opava
- Occupations: Photographer, university teacher

Dita Pepe (née Hornsteinerová; born 5 September 1973) is a Czech photographer. She teaches photography at the Institute of Creative Photography (ITF) of the Silesian University in Opava and is known particularly for her staged portrait photography cycle "Self-portraits", in which she has photographed herself with women and men of various ages, characters and social status.

== Early life and education ==
Pepe was born on 5 September 1973 as Dita Hornsteinerová in Ostrava in Czechoslovakia (now the Czech Republic). After graduating from high school in Frýdlant nad Ostravicí in 1992, she ran away from home and stayed with a friend before moving to Germany for five years, where she worked as an au pair. In 1994–1995, she attended a photography course at the Carl von Ossietzky University of Oldenburg, where she met and later married Francesco Pepe, an Italian psychology student. After returning to the Czech Republic, she completed a bachelor's degree in photography at ITF in 1998, with a final thesis entitled "Photography as a form of therapy". She then moved to the Czech capital Prague to work for a magazine but did not enjoy her time there, when she also split from her husband.

== Career ==
Pepe moved to the Moravian-Silesian Beskids mountain range where she met Petr Hrubeš, also a student of photography, who was doing social service work at a psychiatric institution. There she started working with staged photography and took photos of people around her, people from the institution or her family. Her pictures were initially in black-and-white but she increasingly began to use colour. In 1998 she and Hrubeš went to Cologne in Germany where she made a black-and-white series of portraits of people she knew. In 1999 she started working on "The Self-portraits" in which she portrayed herself as a double of women who also appeared in the pictures, almost as twin sisters. All the photos were taken in the women's own environment. She worked on these in her home country as well as in Italy and Germany. This work received the Kodak Nachwuchs Forderpreis. The self-portraits were published in several German and Czech magazines, including EMMA in Germany and Reflex in the Czech Republic. The portraits were also exhibited at the Velryba gallery in Prague and during Photokina 2002 in Cologne, at the Kodak Visual Gallery. Some observers have noted the influence of the American photographer Cindy Sherman on this and her subsequent work.

In 2000, she began teaching photography at an arts school in Ostrava. In 2003, she completed a master's degree in photography at the Silesian University and then became one of the teachers of photography at ITF. The degree was awarded for a series of self-portraits in which she was not, this time, pictured with another woman but replaced the women in portraits with their partners or families. She would dress in the women's clothes and use their possessions, taking the photographs in their daily environments and adapting to the people with whom she was photographed. Her work has been described as reflecting the "Socratic desire to know oneself through others". Sometimes she included her own daughter (born 2003) in the pictures. The photos were exhibited at the first Prague Biennale at the National Gallery of Prague in 2003 and then during the "Month of Photography" in Bratislava in Slovakia.

== Publications ==
Pepe has collaborated with the writer Barbara Baronova on Slečny (The Misses), Měj ráda sama sebe (Love Yourself), Autoportréty (Self-Portraits), Hlasy žen: Austrálie (Voices of Women: Australia), Ženy o ženách (Women About Women), Intimita (Intimacy) and Odolná společnost (Resilient Society). In collaboration with the writer Jana Poncarová, she has published Děvčata první republiky (The Girls of the First Republic) and Vlastní pokoje (Own Rooms). She has worked closely with the Janáček Philharmonic Orchestra and in 2024 published 70. JFO, in recognition of the orchestra's 70th anniversary. In 2021 she published Hranice lásky (Borders of Love), the creative part of her doctoral dissertation at the Tomas Bata University in Zlín, which again explored the idea of art as therapy. This was published in association with Baronova and the Polish visual artist and photographer, Rafał Milach. In thirteen chapters, with contributions by invited authors, the book explored topics such as maternal love, polyamoric love, pedophile love, and love of work. It was nominated for the Magnesia Litera Prize in 2022.

== Awards ==
Several of Pepe's books have won awards. Intimacy was awarded first place in a category of the Magnesia Litera 2016. The same book also won second place in the "Author's Books" category in the Most Beautiful Czech Books 2015 competition organized by the National Literature Monument and the Ministry of Culture. She was a winner of the first edition of the Fondazione MAST Photography Grant on Industry and Work in 2008, with her winning photographs being exhibited in Bologna, Italy.
