= Emila Medková =

Czech photographer

- Born: Emila Tláskalová; 28 November 1928; Ústí nad Orlicí, Czechoslovakia
- Died: 19 September 1985 (aged 56); Prague, Czechoslovakia
- Spouse: Mikuláš Medek (m. 1951–1974)

Emila Medková, née Emila Tláskalová (19 November 1928 – 19 September 1985) was a Czech photographer, one of the important exponents of the Czech art photography in the second half of the 20th century. Her work was influenced by Surrealism. She was the wife of painter Mikuláš Medek.

== Biography ==
Medková was born in Ústí nad Orlicí. Her father was a typographer and her mother was a seamstress. The family moved to Prague, where, in 1942, Emila began to attend the class of the landscape photographer Josef Ehm at a specialized photography school in the Smíchov district of Prague.

Her work has been directly linked to Surrealism. In the early period, she joined a circle of young artists centered around Karel Teige. From 1947 to 1951, she and Mikuláš Medek created collections of staged photographs. She married him on 12 September 1951. From the early 1950s, she focused on creating several loosely overlapping thematic cycles that went through her whole career, up to her death. At the turn of the 1950s and 1960s, she became a leading exponent of the Czech Informel photography. Although she found inspiration mainly in Prague, she created extensive photographic cycles of Paris (1966) and Italy (1967). The life and work of Medková were covered in a monograph designed by art historians Karel Srp and Lenka Bydžovská, curators of her first comprehensive exhibition, held in 2001.

Medková gave only one interview in her life. It was initiated by the renowned art historian Anna Fárová and published in 1976 in the magazine Československá fotografie (Czechoslovak Photography).

After the death of her husband (Medek died in 1974), she suffered a stroke and was partially paralyzed. She died in Prague.

== "Czechoslovak Photography From 1915 to the 1960s" ==
From 10 June to 31 August 1992 the Jacques Baruch Gallery in Chicago showed an exhibit called "Czechoslovak Photography From 1915 to the 1960s.” It showed 90 images by 16 photographers with a range of renown and obscurity. Emila Medkova is significant in that she was the only female entry in this male-dominated show.

== Solo exhibitions ==
- 1960 Výstavka fotografií Emilie Medkové z let 59 a 60, Krajský vlastivědný ústav v budově muzea, Hradec Králové
- 1962 Galerie Krzywe kolo, Warsaw, Poland
- 1963 Photographs 1951-1963, Hluboká nad Vltavou Castle, Hluboká nad Vltavou
- 1963 Emila Medková. Photographs, Oblastní galerie, Liberec
- 1963 Emila Medková - photographs 1951-1963, Vlastivědné muzeum, Písek
- 1963 Emilia Medková. Abstractions?, Miami Museum of Modern Art, Miami, USA
- 1963 Výstava umělecké fotografie E. Medkové, Dům osvěty ve stálé výstavní síni v budově Městské knihovny, Kralupy nad Vltavou
- 1964 Dům pánů z Kunštátu, Brno
- 1965 Emila Medková, Divadlo Jednotného závodního klubu ROH, Ústí nad Orlicí
- 1965 Emila Medková. Fotografie z let 1949-1964., Galerie mladých, Alšova síň, Prague
- 1966 Emila Medková. Photographs., Miami Museum of Modern Art, Miami, USA
- 1970 Mikuláš Medek. Emila Medková., Galerie am Klosterstern, Hamburg, Germany
- 1978 Emila Medková, Minigalerie VÚVL (Výzkumný ústav veterinárních léčiv), Brno-Medlánky
- 1979 Dům pánů z Kunštátu, Brno
- 1980 Emila Medková. Photographs., Výstavní síň, Česká Třebová
- 1984 Galerie Jindřicha Štreita, Sovinec
- 1985 Fotochema, Prague
- 1987 Emila Medková. Photographs., Obvodné kultúrne a spoločenské stredisko Bratislava II, Spoločenský dom Trnávka, Bratislava
- 1988 Galerie Jindřicha Štreita, Sovinec
- 1990 Emila Medková. Začátek a konec iluzí., Galerie V předsálí, KS Blansko
- 1995 Pražský dům fotografie, Prague
- 1997 Emila Medková: Surrealistische Fotografie., Tschechisches Zentrum, Berlin, Germany
- 1997 Emila Medková: Surrealistische Fotografie., LiteraturWerkstatt, Berlin, Germany
- 2000 Z pozůstalosti, Pražský dům fotografie, Prague
- 2000 Galerie Franze Kafky, Prague
- 2001 Ateliér Josefa Sudka, Prague
- 2001 Dům U kamenného zvonu, Prague
- 2003 Emila Medková, Dům fotografie, Český Krumlov
- 2004 Emila Medková - Surreale Sujets der tschechischen Fotografin, Museum Bad Arolsen - Schloss, Germany
- 2004 Stadtmuseum Hofheim am Taunus, Germany
- 2004 Galerie der Stadt Tuttlingen, Tuttlingen, Germany
- 2005 Emila Medková - fotografické dílo, Galerie pod radnicí, Ústí nad Orlicí

== Selected bibliography ==
- Kříž, Jan (1965). Emila Medková. Umělecká fotografie. Prague: Státní nakladatelství krásné literatury a umění.
- Nádvorníková, Alena (1995). Kuneš, Aleš (ed.). Emila Medková, 1928-1985. Prague: Pražský dům fotografie.
- Srp, Karel (2001). Bydžovská, Lenka (ed.). Emila Medková. Prague: Kant. ISBN 9788086217505.
- Srp, Karel (2005). Emila Medková. Prague: Torst. ISBN 9788072152384.
