= Jan Pohribný =

Czech photographer (born 1961)

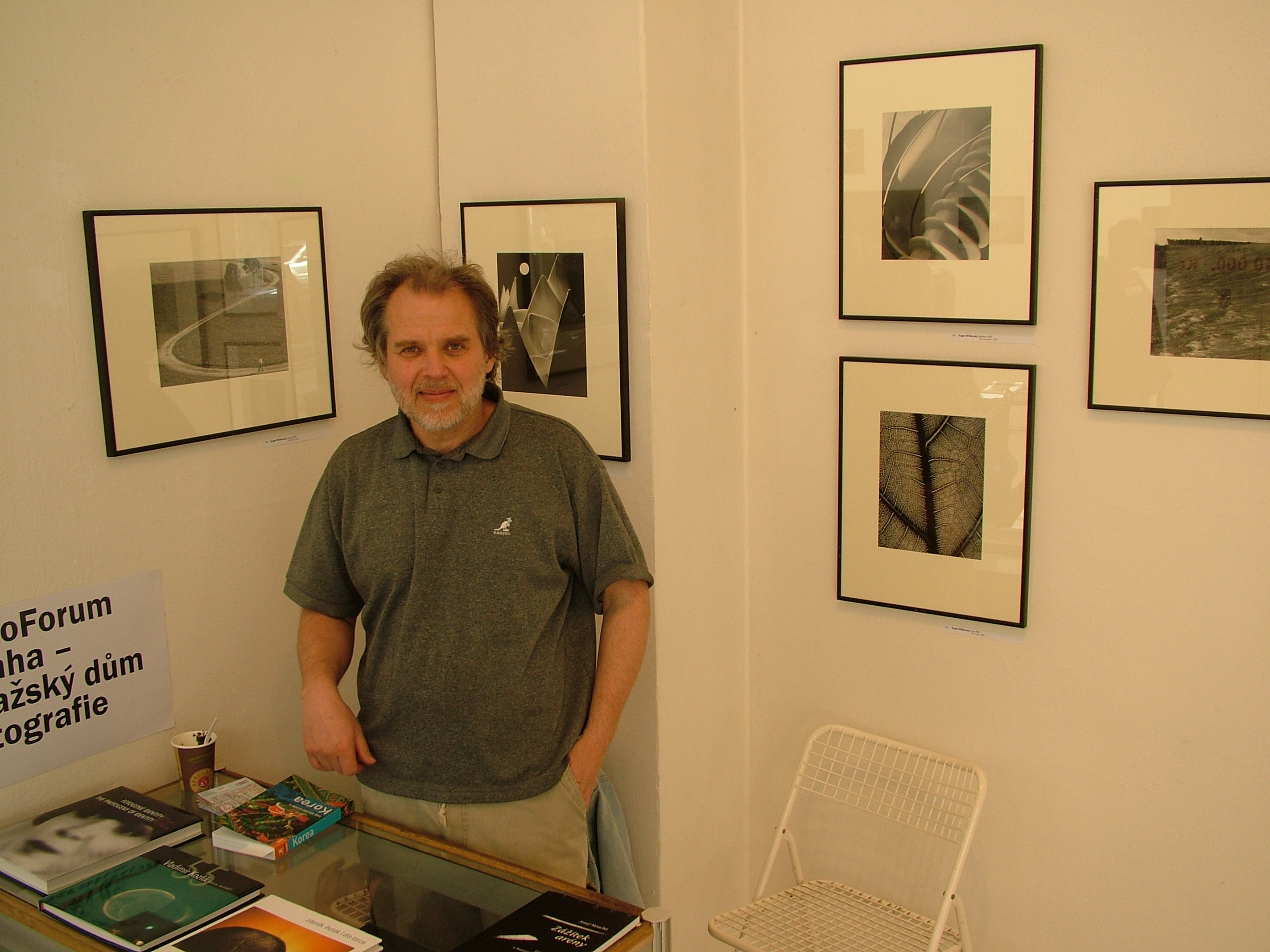
- Born: 8 February 1961 (age 65); Prague
- Occupation: Photographer

Jan Pohribný (born 1961) is a Czech photographer.

== Education ==
- 1976–1980 Secondary school for Graphic Arts in Prague (line Applied Photography)
- 1981–1986 Film and TV School of the Academy of Performing Arts in Prague (the Department of Artistic Photography)
- 1985–1986 6 Months study program at University of Applied Arts in Helsinki (FIN)

== Experience ==
Since 1986, he has worked as a freelance photographer-artist. On top of his artistic works he works predominantly in the field of design and illustration photography. He co-operates with a number of leading agencies, companies and magazines at home-country and abroad. Since 1990 he is a member of Professional Photographers Association and a member of Prague House of Photography, where he acted (1992–1997) as a lector as well as main coordinator at Summer Workshop Program of PHP. Since 2003 he is a member of its executive board Since 1995 he is a founding member and president of Society for Únětician Culture Renovation. Since 1998 he works as part-time teacher at Silesian University, Institute of Creative Photography. He leads number of workshops home and abroad.

Since 2000 he gives regularly the lectures at Polytechnic Art School in Imatra (FIN). In 2006 he was working as artist in residence in Finland's Southern Savonia region.

== Awards ==
Award of City Arles, R.I.P. Arles (F), 1990

- 2. prize in Czech Press Photo, Art and Culture Category, Prague (CZ), 1995
- 2. prize in Czech Press Photo, Nature and Environment Category, Prague (CZ), 1997
- 3. prize in Czech Press Photo, Art and Culture Category, Prague (CZ), 2001
- Title Qualified European Photographer, by FEP, Brussel (B), 2001

== Gallery ==
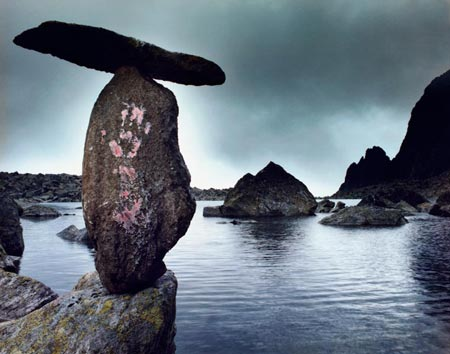
by Jan Pohribný: Megalit land, 1988

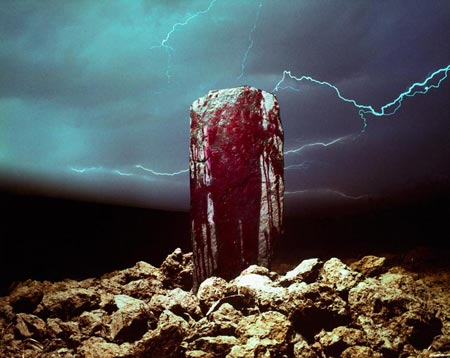
by Jan Pohribný: Tempter, 1989

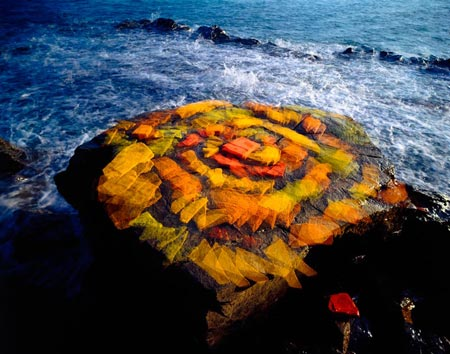
by Jan Pohribný: Imperia, 1992

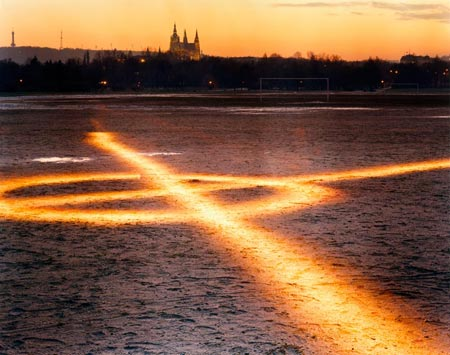
by Jan Pohribný: Letná. 1997

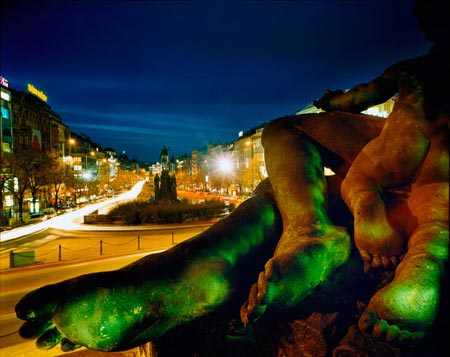
by Jan Pohribný: Václavské náměstí, 2001

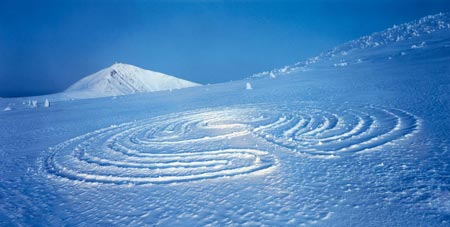
by Jan Pohribný: Endbeginning, 2005

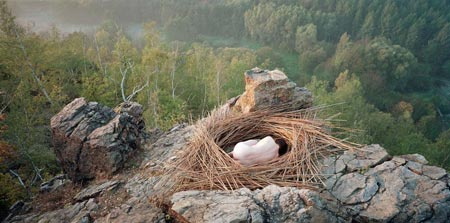
by Jan Pohribný: Nest, 2007

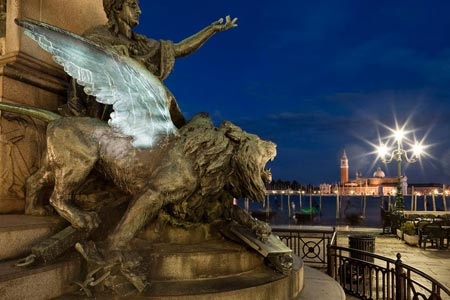
by Jan Pohribný: Leone, 2009

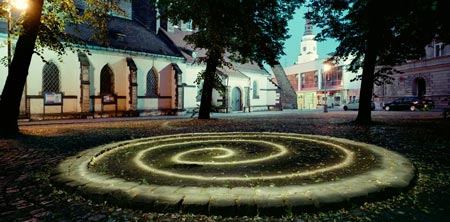
by Jan Pohribný: Spirála, 2009

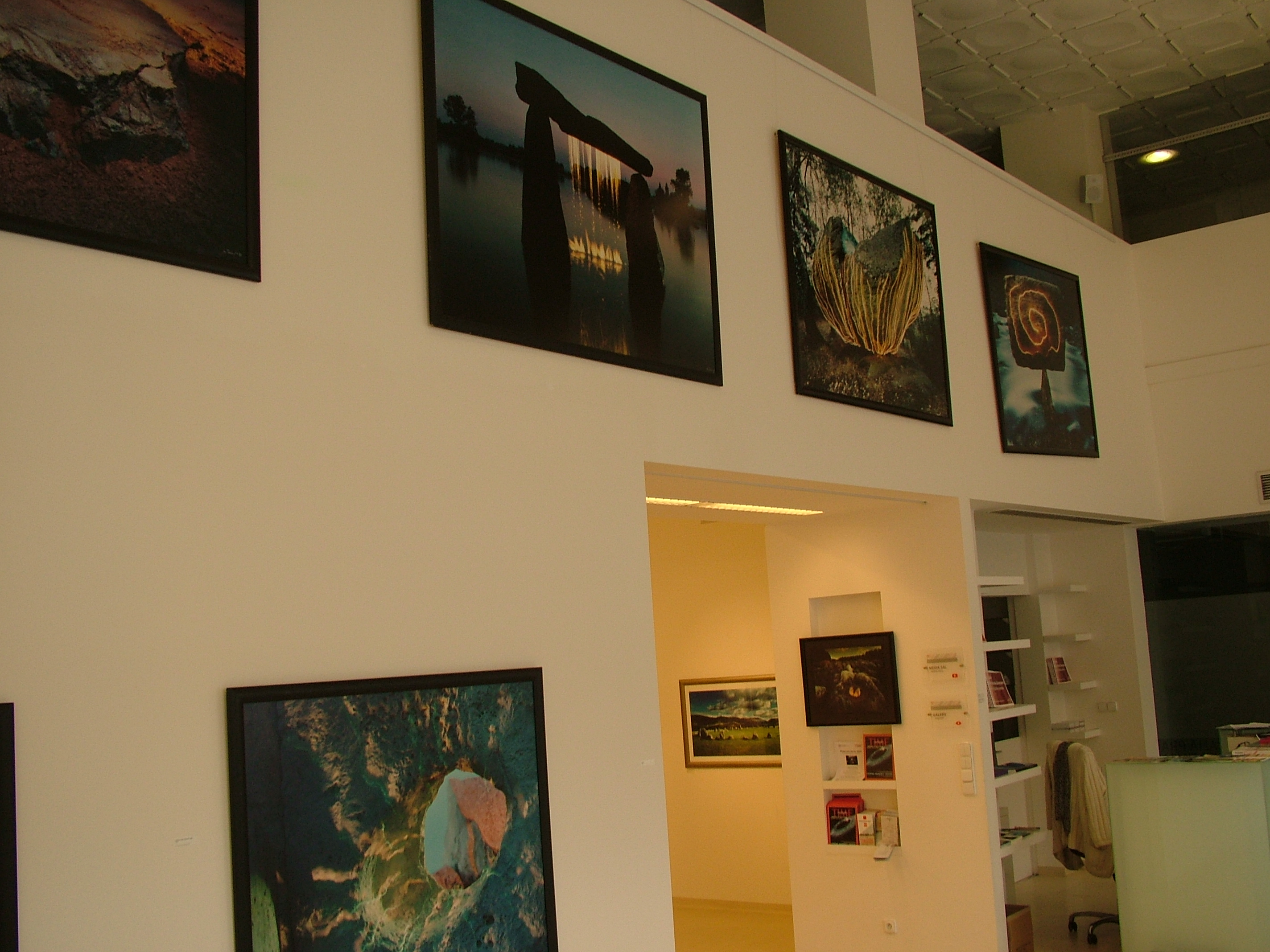
Exhibition Kamenná posedlost in České centrum, Prague, 2008
