= Silesian University =

Silesian University may refer to:

- University of Silesia in Katowice — Poland
- Silesian University in Opava — Czech Republic
- Silesian University of Technology — Gliwice, Poland
- Medical University of Silesia in Katowice — Poland
- Schlesische [=Silesian] Friedrich-Wilhelms-Universität zu Breslau (before 1945) — now University of Wrocław, Poland
