= Rafał Milach =

Polish visual artist and photographer (born 1978)

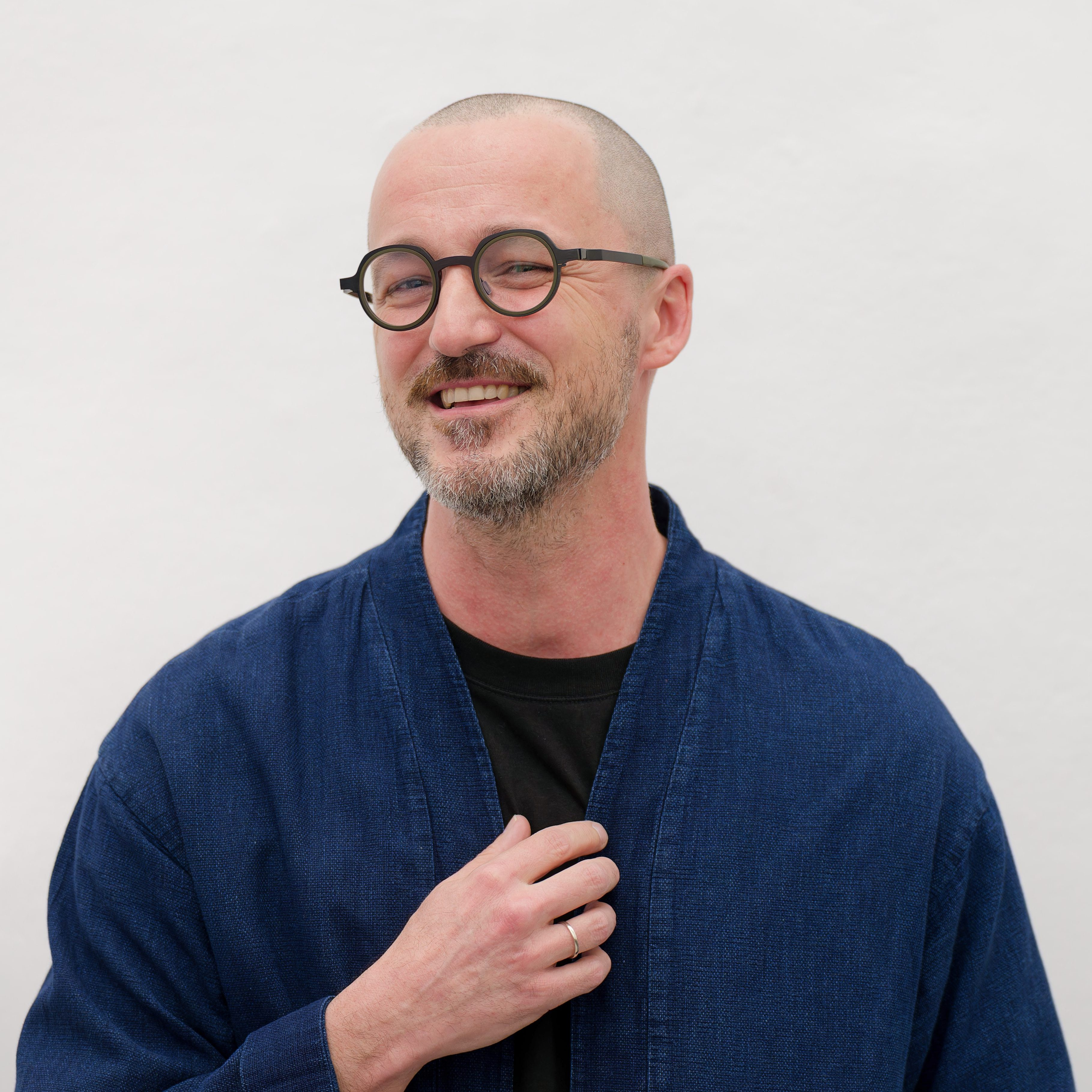
Rafał Milach (2025)

Rafał Milach (born 1978) is a Polish visual artist and photographer. His work focuses on the tension between society and power structures. Author of protest books and critical publications on state control. He is a full member of Magnum Photos and lectures in photography at the Krzysztof Kieślowski Film School at the Silesian University in Katowice

Milach's books include Strike (2021), I Am Warning You (2021), 7 Rooms (2011), In the Car with R (2012), Black Sea of Concrete (2013), The Winners (2014) and The First March of Gentlemen (2017). He is a co-founder of the Archive of Public Protests and Sputnik Photos collectives

In 2008, he won a World Press Photo award. In 2011, 7 Rooms won the Pictures of the Year International Best Photography Book Award. In 2017, his exhibition Refusal was a finalist for the Deutsche Börse Photography Prize. His book Strike was named the Author Book Award at the Rencontres Photographiques d'Arles 2022. In 2023, he was awarded the Dr. Erich Salomon Award

== Life and work ==
Milach was born in 1978 in Gliwice, Poland. He graduated from the Academy of Fine Arts in Katowice in 2003 and the Institute of Creative Photography (ITF), Silesian University in Opava, Czech Republic.

With ten other Central Eastern European photographers, he co-founded Sputnik Photos, a collective documenting transition in post-Soviet states.

For his first book, 7 Rooms (2011), Milach accompanied and photographed seven young people for several years living in the Russian cities of Moscow, Yekaterinburg and Krasnoyarsk.

In the Car with R (2012) was made on a 10-day road trip, driving 1450 kilometres around Iceland's circular Route 1. Milach made photographs and his local guide, the writer Huldar Breiðfjörð, made diary entries.

Black Sea of Concrete (2013) is about the Ukrainian Black Sea coast, about its people, of whom he made portraits, and the abundant Soviet-era geometric blocks strewn along the coastline.

Milach spent two years in Belarus from 2011 exploring its dire economic and political situation. Belarus is "a country caught between the ultra-traditional values of an older Soviet era and the viral influence of western popular culture." Milach was interested in the clean, tidy glamorous facade maintained by the state. His book The Winners (2014), portraits of winners of various "Best of Belarus" state and local contests promoted by the government, is a typology of state propaganda. It depicts mostly people, but also anonymous interiors that had won awards. The obscure official prizes are intended to foster national pride but to an outside audience might appear tragicomic. Milach travelled around the country working in the role of "an old-fashioned propaganda photographer". He was guided by the authorities as to who, where and how to photograph, a process which only improved his revealing the ideology of the state. Milach has said "the winners are everywhere, but the winnings are not for the winners – they are for the system", "the state is not interested in individuals, only in mass control."

The First March of Gentlemen (2017) was made on a 2016 residency at Kolekcja Września to make work about life in Września. The town is synonymous with the Września children strike, the protests of Polish children and their parents against Germanization that occurred between 1901 and 1904. In 2016, there were many demonstrations by Citizens of Poland, a civic movement engaged in pro-democracy and anti-fascist actions, opposed to the political changes brought about by the government led by the Law and Justice (PiS) party. Milach's book of collages mixes illustrations of the children strike with characters that lived in Września during the communist era in the 1950s and 1960s taken by local amateur photographer Ryszard Szczepaniak. This "delineates a fictitious narrative that can be read as a metaphor, commenting on the social and political tensions of the present day."

Milach became a nominee member of Magnum Photos in 2018 and as of 2022 is an associate member. He co-founded the Archive of Public Protests in 2019. He lectures in photography at the ITF.

== Personal life ==
He is married to Ania Nałęcka-Milach.

== Publications ==
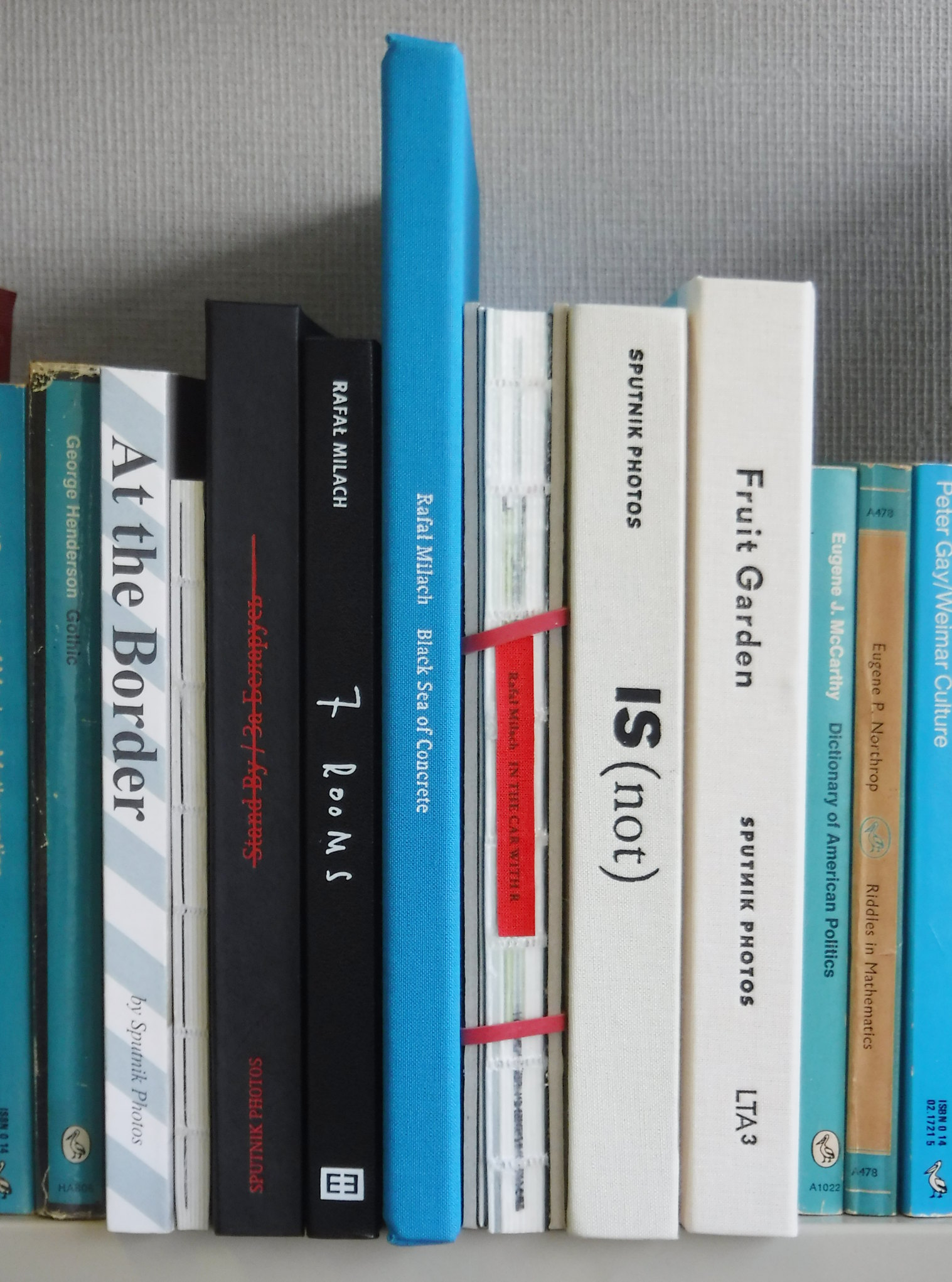
Books by Milach (or by Sputnik Photos with contributions by him) flanked by irrelevant Pelicans; left to right: At the Border, U, Stand BY, 7 Rooms, Black Sea of Concrete, In the Car with R, IS (not), Fruit Garden

=== Publications by Milach ===
- 7 Rooms. With texts by Svetlana Alexievich.
  - First edition. Heidelberg, Germany: Kehrer, 2011. ISBN 978-3-86828-265-8.
  - Second edition. Heidelberg, Germany: Kehrer, 2013.
- Black Sea of Concrete. Warsaw: [Rafał Milach], 2013. Photographs and text (in English). Edition of 300 copies. ISBN 978-83-933361-1-1.
- The Winners.
  - First edition. London: Gost, 2014. ISBN 978-0-9574272-7-3. Edition of 553 copies (500 copies of the regular edition, 53 copies of the special edition).
  - Second edition. London: Gost, 2014. ISBN 978-0-9574272-7-3. Edition of 200 copies.
- The First March of Gentlemen. Collages and photographs by Milach, archival images by Ryszard Szczepaniak, text by Maciej Pisuk, Milach, and Karol Szymkowiak.
  - First edition. Kolekcja Wrzesińska, 2017.
  - Second edition. London: Gost, 2018. ISBN 978-1-910401-17-0. Edition of 650 copies.
- Nearly Every Rose On The Barriers In Front Of The Parliament. Warsaw: Jednostka Gallery, 2018. Polish-language edition; ISBN 978-83-949273-1-8; edition of 300 copies. English-language edition; ISBN 978-83-949273-2-5; edition of 200 copies.
- I Am Warning You. London: Gost, 2021. ISBN 978-1-910401-60-6. With essays by Michael Dear, Antje Rávic Strubel and Ziemowit Szczerek. Boxed set of four books, #13767, I Am Warning You, Death Strip and collected essays.
- Strajk / Strike. Jednostka Gallery, 2021. ISBN 9788394927349. With essays by Iwona Kurz, Karolina Gembara, and Aleksandra Boćkowska.

=== Zines by Milach ===
- Pressident. Galeria Szara, 2017. ISBN 978-83-938735-2-4. 5 posters. Edition of 350 copies.

=== Publications paired with others ===
- In the Car with R: 29 Notes on Photography, Iceland and More. Gliwice: Museum in Gliwice, 2011. ISBN 978-83-89856-40-1. (Note: The English- and Polish-language editions of In the Car with R share one ISBN.) "Project manager: Maga Sokalska / Czytelnia Sztuki". Photographs by Milach, text (an English translation of Með R í bílnum) by Huldar Breiðfjörð. Edition of 450 copies.
- W samochodzie z R.: 29 uwag o fotografii, Islandii i nie tylko. Gliwice: Muzeum w Gliwicach, 2011. ISBN 978-83-89856-40-1. Photographs by Milach, text (a Polish translation of Með R í bílnum) by Huldar Breiðfjörð. Edition of 250 copies.

=== Publications with contributions by Milach ===
- At the Border. [Warsaw]: Sputnik Photos, 2008. ISBN 978-83-927485-0-2. Photographs by Andrej Balco, Jan Brykczyński, Manca Juvan, Justyna Mielnikiewicz, Milach, Domen Pal, Agnieszka Rayss and Filip Singer; texts in English. The untitled preface says that the book "describes the illegal labour markets in the new member states of the European Union (Poland, Slovakia and Slovenia)." Milach contributes an essay, "Linh in Poland", about a Vietnamese man working at Jarmark Europa.
- U. [Warsaw]: Sputnik Photos, 2010. ISBN 978-83-927485-1-9. Photographs by Jan Brykczyński, Andrej Balco, Andrei Liankevich, Agnieszka Rayss, Milach (from the series Black Sea of Concrete), Filip Singer, Ivan Kurinnoy, Janis Pipars and Justyna Mielnikiewicz. With short texts in English by Serhiy Zhadan, Irena Karpa, and the photographers. "Photos taken in Ukraine in 2008–2010"; "the non-profit organization Altemus commissioned a team of young East European photographers from Sputnik Photos collective and Ukrainian writers, to travel the country and capture its ethos". Milach is credited as "book photo editor". Edition of 300 copies.
- IS (not). [Warsaw]: Sputnik Photos, 2010. Edited by Andrzej Kramarz. ISBN 978-83-927485-8-8. Edition of 1000 copies. "A group project about Iceland by 5 polish photographers and 5 Icelandic writers." Photography by Jan Brykczyński, Michał Łuczak, Milach (from the series In the Car with R), Adam Pańczuk and Agnieszka Rayss; text in English by Kristín Heiða Kristinsdóttir, Sindri Freysson, Hermann Stefánsson, Sigurbjörg Þrastardóttir and Huldar Breiðfjörð.
- Stand By = Ӡа Беларусь. Warsaw: Sputnik Photos, 2012. ISBN 978-83-927485-5-7. Photographs of Belarus by Jan Brykczyński, Andrei Liankevich, Manca Juvan, Milach (from the series The Winners), Justyna Mielnikiewicz, Adam Pańczuk and Agnieszka Rayss. With text by Victor Martinovich in English and Belarusian. Edition of 1000 copies.
- Distant Place. Warsaw: Copernicus Science Centre, 2012. ISBN 978-83-927485-5-7. 5 books in soft cover, newspaper.
- Contact sheets. The Selected Photos. Vol II. Postcart, 2014. ISBN 978-8886795869. Edited by Giammaria DE Gasperis. With a foreword by Elisabeth Biondi.
- Psopplaainnd. Mapping the Blind Spots. Warsaw: Sputnik Photos; Madrid: Nophoto, 2014. ISBN 978-83-63610-99-9.
- Lost Territories Wordbook. Lost Territories Archive 1. Warsaw: Sputnik Photos, 2016. Photographs by various. Nearly one hundred short texts from twenty-one authors.
- Fruit Garden. Lost Territories Archive 3. Warsaw: Sputnik Photos, 2017. ISBN 978-83-941826-7-0. Photographs by Andrej Balco, Jan Brykczyński, Andrei Liankevich, Michał Łuczak, Milach, Adam Pańczuk and Agnieszka Rayss; texts in English by Stefan Lorenzutti and Maciej Pisuk; edited by Milach. Edition of 500 copies.

== Awards ==
- 2009: Winner, first prize stories, Arts and Entertainment, World Press Photo 2008, Amsterdam
- 2012: 7 Rooms won Best Photography Book Award, 69th / 2011 Pictures of the Year International
- 2017: Finalist, Deutsche Börse Photography Prize for his exhibition Refusal
- 2019: Light Work Artist Residency, Syracuse NY.
- 2023: Winner, Dr. Erich Salomon Award from the German Society for Photography

== Exhibitions ==
- 7 Rooms, Brandts Museum of Photographic Art, Brandts, Odense, Denmark, 2013–2014
- Refusal, Atlas Sztuki Gallery, Łódź, Poland, 2017.
- The Winners, Side Gallery, Newcastle upon Tyne, UK, 2018
- Refusal, Deutsche Börse Photography Prize, The Photographers' Gallery, London, 2018
- 7 Rooms, Zachęta National Gallery of Art, Warsaw, Poland 2012
