= Archive of Public Protests =

The Archive of Public Protests (Polish: Archiwum Protestów Publicznych; A-P-P or APP) is a collective of photographers and writers and their work documenting post-2015 protests in Poland, established in 2019. A website and an Instagram account host its images, and it also publishes Strike Newspaper. Members of the collective include co-founder Rafał Milach as well as Adam Lach and Chris Niedenthal. The collective has been nominated for the Spojrzenia award as well as the Paszport Polityki, and has had an exhibition of its work at Labyrinth Gallery in Lublin.

== Details ==
The Archive of Public Protests was established in 2019 by Rafał Milach, and five other photographers, in response to Law and Justice taking power and making drastic changes to policy and legislation, resulting in many protests and protest movements.

A website and an Instagram account host the images, which include photographs of the protests against Polish judiciary reforms, the August 2020 LGBT protests in Poland, the 2020–2021 women's strike protests in Poland, and the 2020–2021 Belarusian protests.

The archive is intended "to serve as a resource, as evidence of the protests", given "Polish mainstream media, which is now almost entirely controlled by the state, has given little airtime to the ongoing action." "There is no editorial goal. Instead, the APP is a depository of information for academics, historians and journalists to utilise."

The collective also publishes Gazeta Strajkowa / Strike Newspaper, which launched in 2020. It includes photography, writing, bold typography and coded symbolism. The printed paper is handed out for free, or available to download. Its design is such that people can "hold up the pages as flags, paste them on walls as posters, and display them in windows."

== Members ==
- Michał Adamski
- Marta Bogdańska
- Karolina Gembara
- Łukasz Głowala
- Agata Kubis
- Michalina Kuczyńska
- Marcin Kruk
- Adam Lach
- Alicja Lesiak
- Rafał Milach
- Joanna Musiał
- Chris Niedenthal
- Wojtek Radwański
- Bartek Sadowski
- Paweł Starzec
- Karolina Sobel
- Grzegorz Wełnicki
- Dawid Zieliński

== Publications ==
- Gazeta Strajkowa / Strike Newspaper n. 1. Self-published, 2020. ISBN 9788393336142. (Note: The 1st edition of the newspaper is freely available within the APP site here)
- Gazeta Strajkowa / Strike Newspaper n. 2. Self-published, 2020. ISBN 9788393336159. (Note: The 2nd edition of the newspaper is freely available within the APP site here)
- Gazeta Strajkowa / Strike Newspaper n. 3. Self-published, 2021. ISBN 9788393336197. (Note: The 3rd edition of the newspaper is freely available within the APP site here)
- Gazeta Strajkowa / Strike Newspaper n. 4. Self-published, 2021. ISBN 9788362978397. (Note: The 4th edition of the newspaper is freely available within the APP site here)
- Gazeta Strajkowa / Strike Newspaper n. 5. Self-published, 2021. ISBN 9788395636738. (Note: The 5th edition of the newspaper is freely available within the APP site here)
- Gazeta Strajkowa / Strike Newspaper n. 6. Self-published, 2021. ISBN 978-83-956367-4-5. (Note: The 6th edition of the newspaper is freely available within the APP site here)

== Awards ==
- 2021: Nominated, Spojrzenia, Zachęta
- 2021: Nominated, Paszport Polityki, Polityka

== Exhibitions ==
=== Solo exhibitions by APP ===
- It's Going to Be Fine, We Just Need to Change Everything: The Archive of Public Protests, Chris Niedenthal, Labyrinth Gallery, Lublin, Poland, 2021/22

=== Group exhibitions ===
- Who Will Write the History of Tears: Artists on Women's Rights, Museum of Modern Art, Warsaw, 2021/22

== See also ==
- 2015 Polish presidential election
- 2020 Polish presidential election
