= Jiříkov (Bruntál District) =

- Municipality
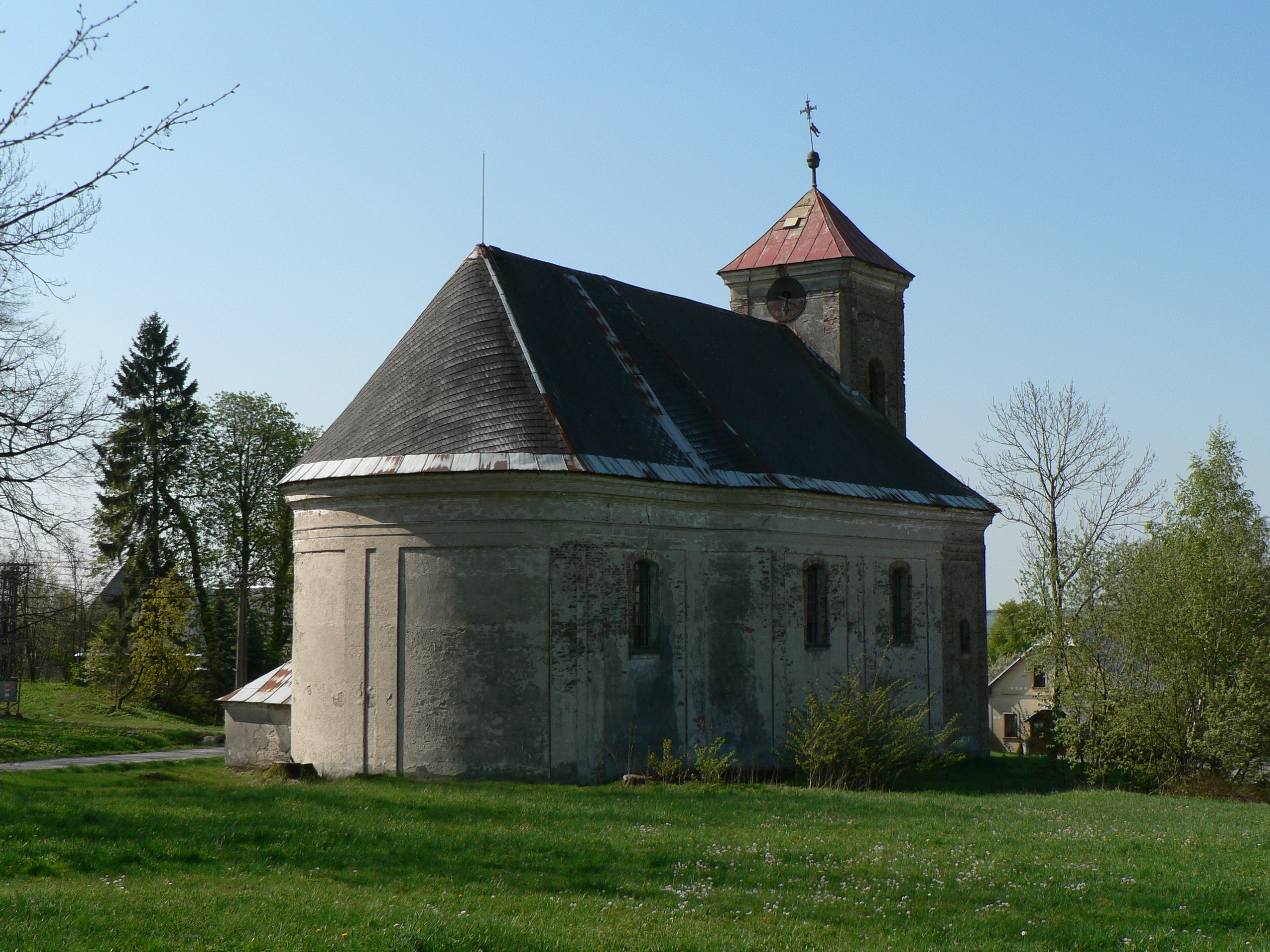
- Church of Saint Michael the Archangel

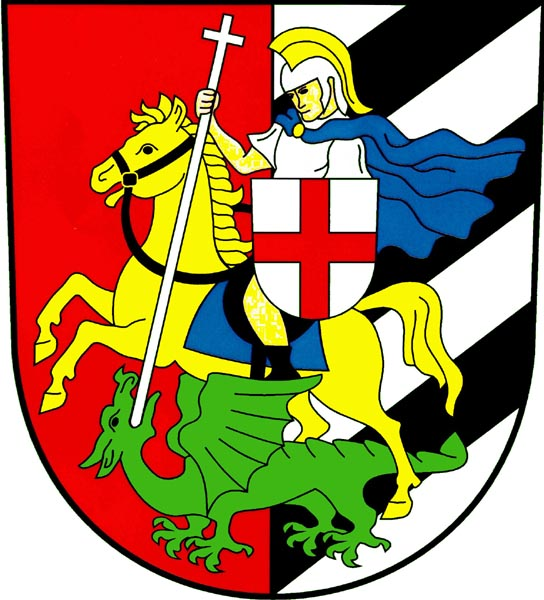
- Flag Coat of arms

- Location in the Czech Republic
- Coordinates: 49°51′14″N 17°16′39″E
- Country: Czech Republic
- Region: Moravian-Silesian
- District: Bruntál
- First mentioned: 1264

Area
  - Total: 35.28 km^{2} (13.62 sq mi)
- Elevation: 445 m (1,460 ft)

Population (2026-01-01)
  - Total: 352
  - Density: 9.98/km^{2} (25.8/sq mi)
- Time zone: UTC+1 (CET)
  - Summer (DST): UTC+2 (CEST)
- Postal code: 792 01
- Website: www.obecjirikov.cz

Jiříkov (German: Girsig) is a municipality and village in Bruntál District in the Moravian-Silesian Region of the Czech Republic. It has about 400 inhabitants.

== Administrative division ==
Jiříkov consists of five municipal parts (in brackets population according to the 2021 census):

- Jiříkov (148)
- Kněžpole (40)
- Křížov (31)
- Sovinec (51)
- Těchanov (41)

== Geography ==
Jiříkov is located about 20 kilometres (12 mi) southwest of Bruntál and 28 km (17 mi) north of Olomouc. It lies in the Nízký Jeseník range. The highest point is located on the slopes of the hill Návrší, at 700 m (2,297 ft) above sea level. The Oslava River flows along the western municipal border.

== History ==
The first written mention of Jiříkov is from 1264. Jiříkov was probably founded as part of the colonisation activities of the Olomouc Bishop Bruno von Schauenburg. In 1494 the village belonged to the Sovinec estate.

Of the original row of buildings, only a few houses remained after World War II. Today the old part of the village consists mostly of new buildings.

== Demographics ==
Historical population

Year	Pop.	±%
1869	1,781	—
1880	1,796	+0.8%
1890	1,697	−5.5%
1900	1,503	−11.4%
1910	1,383	−8.0%

Year	Pop.	±%
1921	1,335	−3.5%
1930	1,282	−4.0%
1950	640	−50.1%
1961	544	−15.0%
1970	397	−27.0%

Year	Pop.	±%
1980	392	−1.3%
1991	316	−19.4%
2001	304	−3.8%
2011	262	−13.8%
2021	311	+18.7%

Source: Censuses

== Transport ==
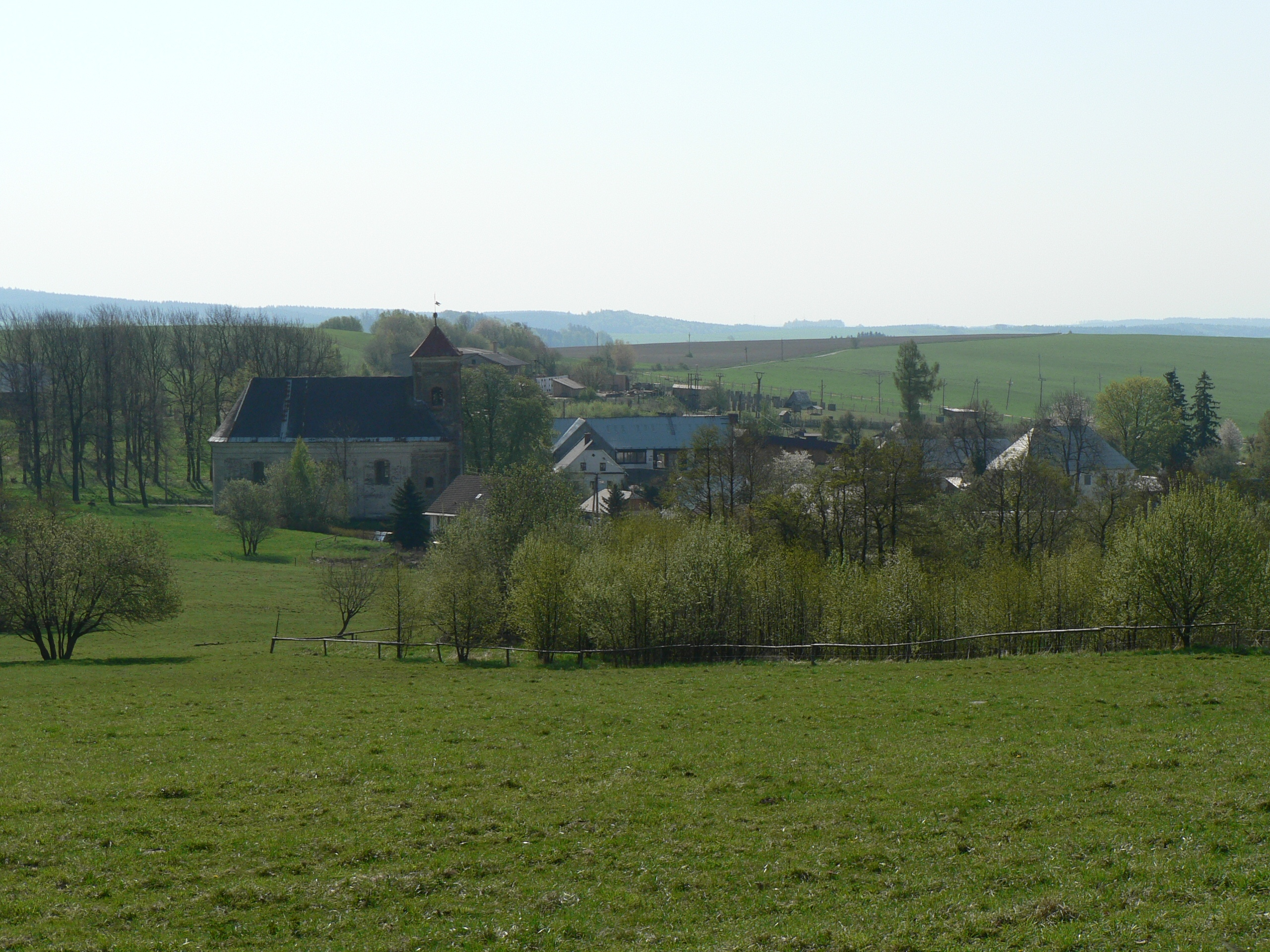
Old part of the village of Jiříkov

There are no railways or major roads passing through the municipality.

== Sights ==
The main landmark of Jiříkov is the Church of Saint Michael the Archangel. It was built in the Baroque style in from 1787. Its prismatic Renaissance tower dates from 1605.

In the village of Sovinec is the Sovinec Castle. It was founded between 1329 and 1332.

== In popular culture ==
Jiříkov and its inhabitants play a major role in Bohdan Sláma's film The Wild Bees (2001).
