= Chris Niedenthal =

British-Polish photographer

Christopher Jan Niedenthal
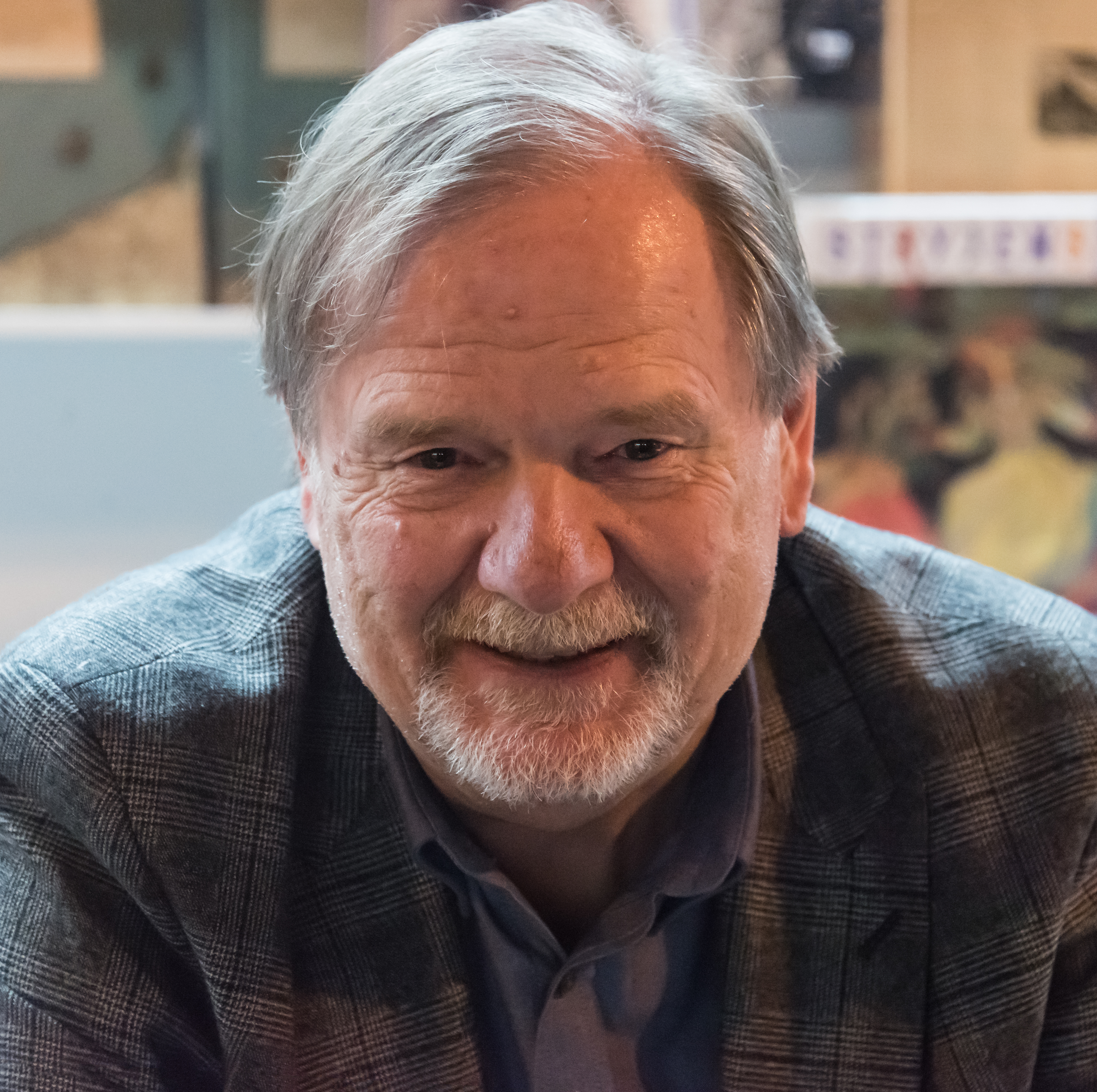
- Niedenthal in 2022
- Born: 21 October 1950 (age 75); London, England
- Known for: Photography
- Spouse: Karolina Niedenthal
- Awards: World Press Photo; 1986
- Website: chrisniedenthal.com

Christopher Jan Niedenthal (born 21 October 1950) is a British-Polish photographer and photojournalist. He is a member of the Association of Polish Art Photographers and his work has been published in Newsweek, Time, Der Spiegel and Forbes. In 1986 he received a World Press Photo prize for a portrait of János Kádár.

Niedenthal is best known for his series of photographs documenting life behind the Iron Curtain, as well as the history of Solidarność. His picture of an armoured personnel carrier standing in front of Warsaw's "Moscow" cinema screening Apocalypse Now became one of the icons of the martial law in Poland.

== Biography ==
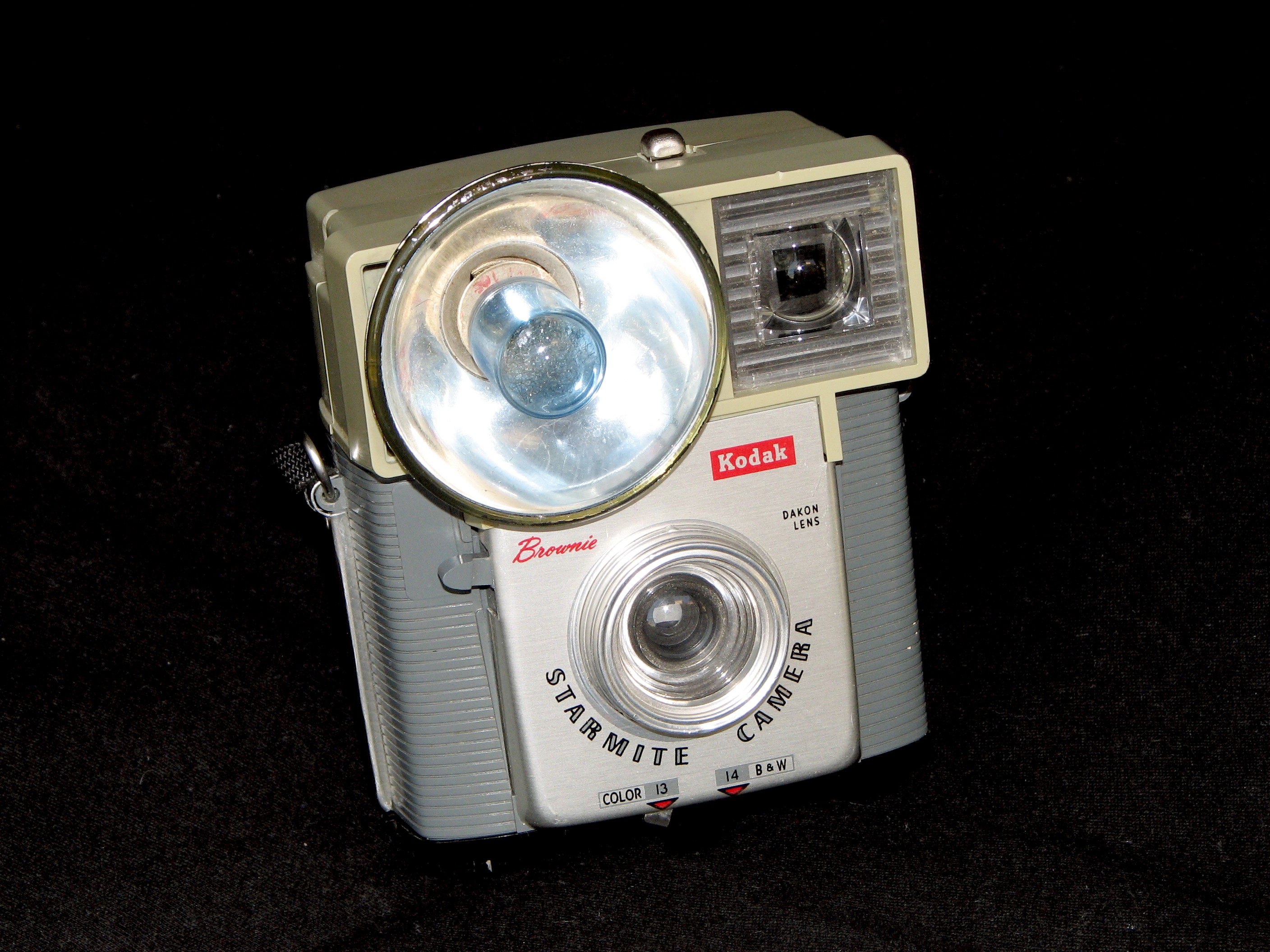
Kodak Starmite, Niedenthal's first camera

Chris Niedenthal was born 1950 in London, to a family of Polish World War II-era refugees. His father was a public prosecutor in Vilnius, but was forced to immigrate to the United Kingdom in 1945, where he started working for the short-lived Ministry of Education. Niedenthal's mother had been working for the émigré Polish Telegraphic Agency. He first visited Poland in 1963 and since then he regularly visited the country.

Niedenthal received his first photographic camera, the Kodak Starmite, at the age of 11. Soon after finishing school he joined the London College of Printing, where he graduated from a three-year photography course. In 1973 he settled in Poland and became a freelancer journalist and photographer for Newsweek. His first major photo report featured illegal churches established against the will of the ruling communist party in the People's Republic of Poland. In 1978 Niedenthal was the first to document the town of Wadowice, the hometown of Karol Wojtyła immediately after the latter had been elected Pope John Paul II. He also documented the pope's first visit to Poland the following year.

In 1980 Niedenthal, together with Michael Dobbs, were the first foreign journalists to enter the Gdańsk Shipyard during the rise of the Solidarność movement. After the community leadership introduced martial law, Niedenthal was one of very few foreign photographers documenting the reality in Poland for western media. He managed to smuggle many of his pictures abroad, to be published in Germany's Der Spiegel or American Newsweek and Time. Among such pictures was one that became an icon of that part of Polish history, depicting a SKOT APC standing in front of a cinema in Warsaw, with a large banner advertising Francis Ford Coppola's Apocalypse Now in the background. His 1986 picture of Hungarian communist leader János Kádár was used on the cover of the international edition of Time magazine and was awarded a World Press Photo prize for that year.

In 1987 Niedenthal moved to Vienna to work for Time's Eastern European office, but returned to Poland soon afterwards. In 1998, he received Polish citizenship and continues to live in Poland.

Niedenthal is a member of the Archive of Public Protests.

== Publications ==
- 13/12.Polska stanu wojennego (13/12 Poland During Martial Law). Warszawa: Edipresse Polska, 2006. ISBN 978-8374771641.
- Danzica 1980: Solidarność. Castel Bolognese (Ravenn): Itaca, 2010. ISBN 9788852602283. Catalogue of an exhibition held in Rimini, Italy, 2010.
- Chris Niedenthal: wybrane fotografie = selected photographs: 1973–1989. Olszanica: Bosz, 2016. ISBN 9788375762327.
- 1989: rok nadziei: Chris Niedenthal: fotografie = A year of hope: Chris Niedenthal: photographs. lszanica: Bosz Szymanik i Wspólnicy, 2017. ISBN 9788375763119.
- Gdańsk 2018. Gdańsk: Museum of Gdańsk, 2019. ISBN 9788361077824.
