= Jan Pňovský ze Sovince =

Jan Pňovský ze Sovince was the son of Hynek Pňovský ze Sovince and Machna z Lomysnice. Before 1490 he bought the castle of Sovinec. He was a disciple of Mathias Corvinus and since 1487 was the highest Judge of the margraviate of Moravia. In 1508, he was succeeded in his lands by his sons Vok Pňovský ze Sovince and Heralt Pňovský ze Sovince.
