= Jindřich Štreit =

Czech photographer and pedagogue (born 1946)

Jindřich Štreit (2020)

Jindřich Štreit (born 5 September 1946) is a Czech photographer and pedagogue. Known for his documentary photography, he concentrates on documenting the rural life and people of Czech villages. He is considered one of the most important exponents of Czech documentary photography.

== Biography ==
Štreit was born in Vsetín on 5 September 1946. He began taking photographs in 1964, during his studies at the Pedagogical Faculty of Palacký University in Olomouc. Following his graduation he worked as a teacher in Rýmařov; later he became director of the school in Sovinec and Jiříkov. In addition to his profession, Štreit actively participated in public life. As a local chronicler he documented the everyday events and life of Czech villages under the communist regime. The photography theorist Antonín Dufek identified him as "a continuer of the tradition of old village teachers, propagators of culture and progress".

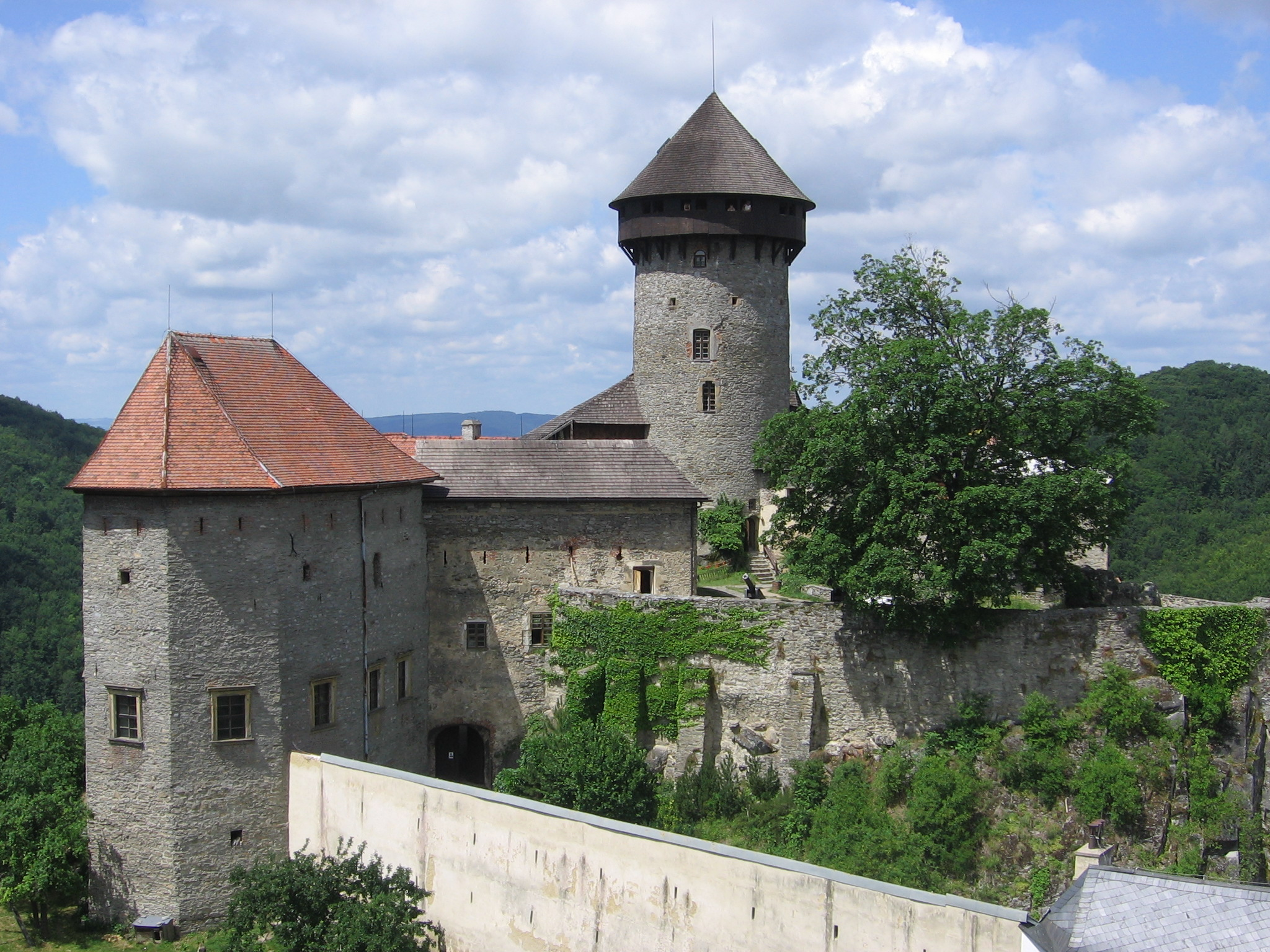
Since the 1980s, Jindřich Štreit has regularly organized exhibitions, concerts and theatrical performances at the Sovinec Castle. The photographer is sometimes nicknamed 'Jindra from Sovinec'.

In the late 1970s, Štreit's approach to photography began to change. He studied at the Institut výtvarné fotografie (Institute of Art Photography) in Brno, led by K. O. Hrubý and Antonín Hinšt. He graduated from the Institute with a cycle of theatrical photography. At the same time, he continued expanding his cycle of everyday life of the villages in the foothills of the Jeseníky Mountains. Additionally, he helped organize cultural life in the region; he participated in organizing exhibitions and concerts.

In 1981, during the general elections in the former Czechoslovakia, Štreit documented the official course of the elections. In some of his photographs made during the meetings of the local authorities, the portrait of the President of Czechoslovakia appeared on photographs in very "unlikely and absurd places". A year later, in June 1982, Štreit agreed to display his works at the exhibition Setkání (The Meeting) organized in Prague by the graphic artist Alena Kučerová. After several hours, the exhibition was banned by the state police and Štreit was arrested and accused of defamation of the President and the country. He was sentenced to ten months' imprisonment with a suspended sentence of two years. As a consequence, he lost his job and was forced to earn a living at a state farm in Rýžoviště. He was banned from taking photographs, but he never respected the ban and returned to photography immediately after his release from the prison. The photography theorist Anna Fárová managed to include his works in the exhibition 9 + 9, visited by Henri Cartier-Bresson, who documented Štreit's installation and published his photos in the French newspaper Le Monde.

In 1989, after the Velvet Revolution and subsequent democratization of Czech society, Štreit was rehabilitated and allowed to take photographs without limitations. In 2009, he was named Professor of Applied Arts by the President of the Czech Republic Václav Klaus. As of 2010, Štreit works as a teacher at the Institut tvůrčí fotografie (Institute of Creative Photography of Silesian University in Opava).

== Selected exhibitions ==
1990

- Sovinec. Side Gallery, Newcastle upon Tyne

2002

- Lidé z kraje písku. City Gallery, Pécs; Muvészetek Háza, Eger (both Hungary)
- Katholische Akademie, Munich (together with Adriena Šimotová)
- Vesnice je svět. Prospekto Fotografijos Galerija, Vilnius; Fujifilm Fotografijos Galerija, Kaunas (both Lithuania)
- Jindřich Štreit: Dans le cadre de Bohemia Magica, Le Château d'Eau, Toulouse
- Mezi námi. Cesty života. Brána naděje, Prague
- Fotografie. Gallery Langův dům, Frýdek-Místek (Czech Republic)
- Za oponou. National Museum, Prague
- Fotografie z kraje písku. New Town Hall, Prague
- Jindřich Štreit-Tvorivé dielne na Slovensku. Czech Centre, Bratislava

2003

- Cesta ke svobodě. Theatre Ludus, Bratislava
- Cesta ke svobodě. Czabai IFIHAZ, Békéscsaba (Hungary)
- Cesta ke svobodě. Theatre Baj Pomorski, Toruń (Poland)
- Lidé olomouckého okresu. Kulturplatz, Münsingen (Switzerland)
- Daleko od domova. Czech Centre, Novorosijsk, Moscow
- Beziehungen. Fotogalerie Friedrichshain, Berlin
- Das Tschechische Dorf. Tschechisches Zentrum / Czechpoint, Berlin
- Interpretace. Gallery Caesar, Olomouc (Czech Republic)
- Úcta k životu. Church of St. Cyril and Methodius, Přerov (Czech Republic)
- Svět dětí. Gallery Auritius, Tábor (Czech Republic)
- Cesty života. Gallery Perseus, Olomouc
- Viděno srdcem. Olomouc
- Lidé mého kraje. Museum in Bruntál, Bruntál

2004

- Lidé z kraje písku. Hungarian Cultural Centre, Helsinki
- Vztahy. Czech Centre, Dresden; Palais für aktuelle Kunst, Glückstadt (Germany); Neumünster (Germany)
- Lidé ledkových dolů. Maison de l'Alsace, Paris
- The Village is a Global World. Side Gallery, Newcastle upon Tyne
- Mezi námi. Gallery Měsíc ve dne, České Budějovice (Czech Republic)
- Život na zámku. Gallery Patro, Olomouc (Czech Republic)
- Tak blízko, tak daleko. M.E.C.C.A., Terezín (Czech Republic)
- Tak blízko, tak daleko. Theatre, Karlovy Vary (Czech Republic)
- Tváře za zdí. Gallery of Critics, Prague
- Lidé mého kraje. Gallery Fiducia, Ostrava; Prague

2005

- Jindřich Štreit. Blue Sky Gallery, Portland
- Ein tschechisches Universum, Gallery Fotoforum, Innsbruck
- Čzech Universum. Photogallery, Bolzano (Italy)
- Jindřich Štreit. Photo-Forum, Bozano
- Jindřich Štreit. Gallery of the Parliament of Lithuania, Vilnius
- So near and yet so far: Photographs from Chechnya and Ingushia. Gallery Vapriikki, Tampere (Finland)
- Tak blízko, tak daleko. Museum Kampa, Prague
- Vztahy. Gallery 4, Cheb (Czech Republic)
- Cesta k člověku. Minorites Monastery, Opava (Czech Republic)
- Fotografie J. Štreita ze sbírky Moravské galerie. Moravian Gallery, Brno

2006

- Vztahy. Gallery ZPAP Pryzmat, Kraków
- Jindřich Štreit. Galeria BWA, Bielsko-Biała (Poland)
- Sovinec. Centrum Kultury Zamek, Galeria Fotografii PF, Poznań
- Jindřich Štreit. European Parliament, Brussels
- Jindřich Štreit. Slovak National Gallery, Bratislava
- Jindřich Štreit. House of Arts, Ostrava (Czech Republic)
- Jindřich Štreit: Fotografie, které mám rád. Museum of Ostrava, Ostrava
- Jindřich Štreit. Orlická galerie, Rychnov nad Kněžnou (Czech Republic)
- Vzpomínky. Malá galerie, Kladno (Czech Republic)
- Jindřich Štreit. Castle, Sovinec (Czech Republic)
- Jindřich Štreit. Gallery Zdeněk Sklenář, Prague

2008

- Das Dorf ist eine Welt. Fotografien. Museum Moderner Kunst Stiftung Wörlen, Passau (Germany)

== Books and exhibition catalogues ==
- Birgus, Vladimír. Jindřich Štreit: Fotografie. Bruntál, 1980.
- 14 regards sur le district de Saint-Quentin. 1992. ISBN 80-85491-27-3.
- Vesnice Je Svet / The Village Is a Global World / Das Dorf Ist Eine Globale Welt / Un village, c'est tout en monde. Arcadia, 1993. ISBN 80-901423-5-4.
- Der Hof: Vom Leben am Lande. ISBN 3-85252-067-3. With Manfred Chobot.
- Štreit, Jindřich. Japonsko: Lidé z Akagi / 日本 赤城村からの人々. Opava, Rychnov n.Kn., 1996. ISBN 80-85879-48-4 (in Czech, German, English, French, and Japanese) Photographs of Akagi in Gunma Prefecture, Japan. With a preface by Vlasta Čiháková-Noshiro (in four languages but not German) and a biography and information about Štreit (in four languages but not Japanese).
- Štreit, Jindřich; Dufek Antonín. Zabavené fotografie / The Confiscated Photographs. Brno: Moravian Gallery, 1999. ISBN 80-238-4236-6 (in Czech and English)
- Štreit, Jindřich; Cousin, Christophe; Wagner, Jean-Jacques. A coeur perdu / Touches of Heart / Doteky srdce. Belfort: Musée d'art et d'histoire de Belfort, 1999. ISBN 80-238-4544-6 (in Czech, English, and French)
- Štreit, Jindřich. Cesta ke svobodě / The Road Towards Freedom / Weg zur Freiheit. Bruntál: Okresní úřad, 2000. ISBN 80-238-4954-9 (in Czech, English, and German)
- Štreit, Jindřich. Brána naděje / The Gate of Hope / La porte de l'espoir / Tor der Hoffnung. Olomouc: Arcibiskupství olomoucké, 2000. (in Czech, English, French, and German)
- Štreit, Jindřich; Wawrzacz, Jiří (text): Lidé Třineckých železáren / People of Třinec Steelworks / Die Menschen die Třinecer Hütte / Les gens de l'usine métallurgique de Třinec. Třinec: Třinecké železárny; Moravia Steel, 2000. (in Czech, English, French, and German)
- People of the Olomouc region / Lidé Olomouckého okresu. New York: Soho Photo; Czech Center New York, 2000. ISBN 80-900054-6-2. (in Czech and English)
- Štreit, Jindřich. Fotóhomok / Fotografie z kraje písku / Photographs from the Flatlands. Budapest: Budapest Galéria, 2000. ISBN 963-00-4339-4. (in Hungarian, Czech, and English)
- Jindřich Štreit ze Sovince, aneb, Kam (ne)vstoupila noha fotografova. Moravský Beroun: Moravská expedice, 2001. ISBN 80-86511-01-4. (in Czech)
- Mezi námi / Among Us. V Sovinci: Společnost přátel umění, 2001. ISBN 8023874535. (in Czech)
- Štreit, Jindřich; Sedláček, Martin (text). Daleko od domova. Brno: Nakladatelství Jaroslav Sedláček, 2002. ISBN 80-238-9393-9 (in Czech)
- Cesty života / Ways of life. Olomouc: Krajský úřad Olomouckého kraje, 2003. ISBN 80-239-1356-5. (in Czech and English)
- Spolu / Together. Olomouc: Občanské sdružení SPOLU, 2003. ISBN 80-239-0602-X. (in Czech and English)
- Jindřich Štreit - Tváře za zdí / Jindřich Štreit - Faces behind the wall / Yinderehe Shitecaide - Weicheng zhi nei. Sedliště ve Slezsku: Lašské muzeum a galerie; Prague: Čínský kulturní institut, 2003. ISBN 80-239-1330-1. (in Czech, English, and Chinese)
- Štreit, Jindřich; Kopřiva, J.; Perunová, K. (text). Tak blízko, tak daleko. Čečna a Ingušsko 2003 / So Close and Yet So Far. Chechnya and Ingushetia 2003 / So nah und doch so fern. Tschetschenien und Ingutschien 2003. Prague: Sdružení Česká katolická charita, 2004. ISBN 80-239-1950-4 (in Czech, English, and German)
- Jindřich Štreit: Fotografie 1965-2005 / Jindřich Štreit: Photographs 1965-2005. Prague: Kant, 2006. ISBN 80-86970-05-1. (in Czech and English)
- Paměť času. Rýmařov: Městské muzeum v Rýmařově, 2006. ISBN 80-239-8204-4. (in Czech)
- Identita reality. V Bruntále: Muzeum v Bruntále, 2007. ISBN 80-87038-04-5. (in Czech and English)
- Ocelový svět / World of steel. Hranice: Dost, 2008. ISBN 80-902942-5-1. (in Czech and English)
- Vítkovice. Prague: Kant, 2008. ISBN 80-86970-82-5. (in Czech)
- Japonsko 1995 - Návraty. Hranice: Dost, 2008. ISBN 80-902942-5-1. (in Czech and English)
- Víra a odpuštění / Faith and forgiveness. Ostrava: Petarda, 2008. ISBN 80-87247-00-0. (in Czech and English)
- Europeans. Prague: Kant, 2009. ISBN 80-86970-89-2. (in English) With Vladimír Birgus and Jindřich Marco.
