= Institute of Creative Photography =

Photography school part of Silesian University (Opava)

- Institut tvůrčí fotografie
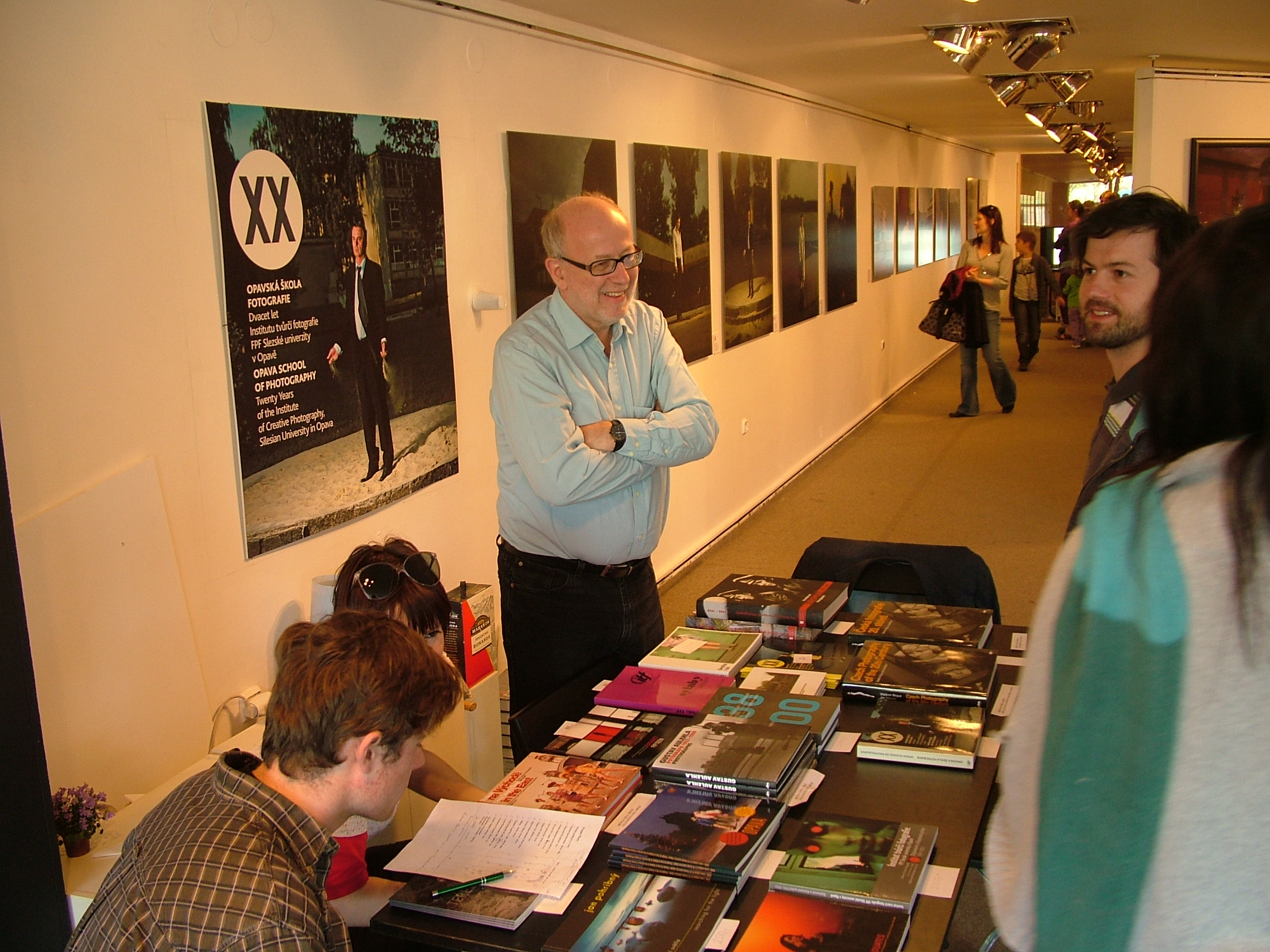
- Presentation of the Institute of Creative Photography at the Prague Photo Festival in 2011, Vladimír Birgus in the center
- Established: 1990
- Affiliations: Silesian University
- Location: Opava, Silesia, Czech Republic (EU); 49°56′6.71″N 17°53′46.98″E
- Website: itf.cz

The Institute of Creative Photography (Czech: Institut tvůrčí fotografie, ITF), also referred as Opava School of Photography, is the largest post-secondary school of photography in the Czech Republic. It is part of Silesian University in Opava.

== Details ==
It currently has more than 200 students from the Czech Republic, Slovakia, Poland, Germany, Italy, Russia, Ukraine and other countries, in BA, MA, and PhD programmes, taught by nine core teachers (Vladimír Birgus – the Head of the ITF, Pavel Mára, Josef Moucha, Dita Pepe, Václav Podestát, Karel Poneš, Tomáš Pospěch, Jiří Siostrzonek, Jindřich Štreit) and seven external teachers.

The system of study at the ITF includes mail assessment of practical exercises assigned by the experienced teachers. The students can also take part in a number of workshops and long-term photography projects. The Bachelor's degree of Creative Photography at the ICP is very universal, and besides the most stressed individual creative activities, it includes practical exercises in all the main areas of artistic, documentary photography, press photography and applied photography as well as lectures in the history and theory of photography, photography criticism, the fine arts, psychology, sociology and other theoretical subjects. Only the graduates of the bachelor course are accepted to the Master's degree of Creative Photography. According to their focus they can choose optional subjects about artistic, documentary and applied photography. The graduates get a complete university qualification in all domains of photography as well as history and theory of photography, and are prepared for tasks of their profession and their own photography creation. A number of graduates undertake a career of independent photographers, press photographers, teachers at schools of photography, curators and photography critics and theoreticians.

The ITF prepares photography expositions of students' works and also of prominent Czech and foreign photographers. The expositions of the ICP students are held in exhibition halls in the Czech Republic but also abroad (i.e. in Opava, Ostrava, Prague, Brno, Zlín, Prostějov, Bratislava, Poznań, Katowice, Vilnius, Kaunas, Würzburg, Bombay and other cities).

== Alumni ==
- Rafał Milach
