= Sovinec Castle =

Coordinates: 49.837°N 17.246°E

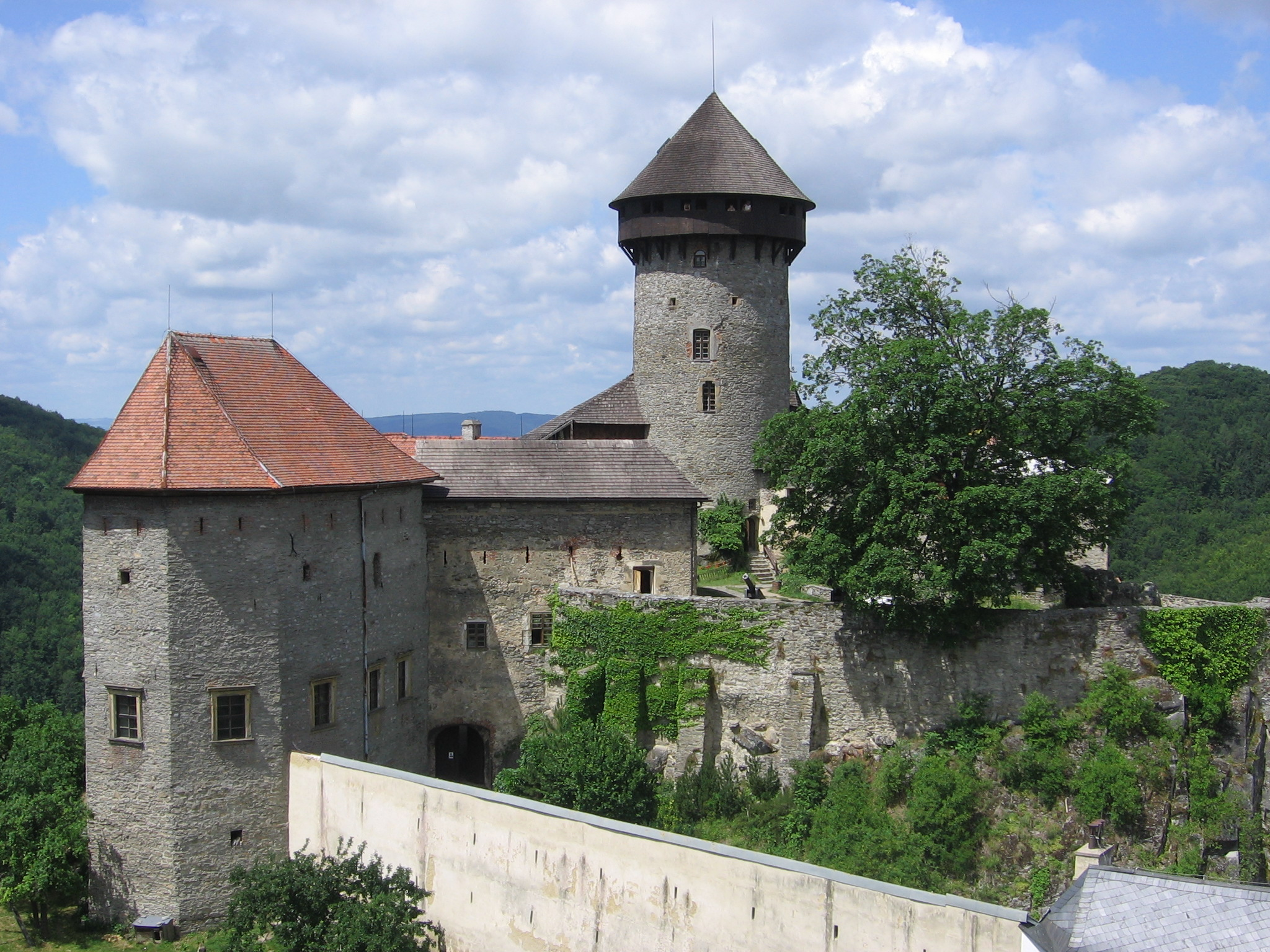
Sovinec Castle

Sovinec Castle (German: Eulenburg) is a castle in Jiříkov in Bruntál District in the Moravian-Silesian Region of the Czech Republic. It is situated on a cone-shaped hill located in the Nízký Jeseník range.

== History ==
=== Lords of Sovinec ===
In the second half of the 13th century, due to their attempts at colonizing the mountains, the Olomouc bishops came into conflict with the Jeseník landlords. Because of the pressure from Olomouc, the brothers Vok and Pavel of the traditional Moravian family of Hrutovic, and who later called themselves of "Huzová", built a castle in Sovinec in the years 1329–1332 to mark the border of their territory. Even though in the first half of the 14th century the Sovinec dynasty translated its name into the equivalent German Eulenburg, they remained the same ancient moravian branch of the Czech Hurtovic dynasty with their own insignia. From the second half of the 14th century they used either their German or their Czech name, and the latter prevailed since the 15th century.

According to Ctibor Tovačovský of Cimburk's legal work, the lords of Sovinec belonged to the 15 oldest Moravian ruling families such as the Boskovics, the Cimburks, and the Pernštejns. They had privileged status over all the other ruling families in the area, held the highest positions and took part in all important issues. As a proof of this might, the signature and seal of Petr of Sovinec is visible on the protest letter which Czech and Moravian noblemen wrote in the occasion of the burning of Jan Hus. Sovinec was also an important Hussite, stronghold which endangered even catholic Olomouc. And it is not by chance that Sovinec was chosen as the meeting place for the important political discussions between Prokop Holý, leader of the Hussite army and Sigismund Korybut, a candidate for the Czech throne. The lords of Sovinec were strong supporters of King George of Poděbrady, famous for his attempts at uniting all European monarchs, in his efforts to include Silesia in his project. Due to their political activity, Mathias Corvinus destroyed the lands of the Sovinec dynasty in August 1474. As testified in 1490 in the Land Codex in the second half of the 15th century, Sovinec was the centre of a strong and united rule consisting of one town and 18 villages, ranging from Paseka in the plains through nearby Rýmařov to Štáhly (Malá Štáhle and Velká Štáhle) on the mountains. The watchtower of the Sovinec castle dates back to this era, and one can still see the Sovinec insignia engraved in its stone. The walls of the fortified village of Sovinec also dates back to that time.

=== 16th and 17th centuries ===
In the beginning of the 16th century Sovinec and the entire territory belonging to it had been savagely pillaged. The ensuing period of peace allowed for prosperity and industry. Theroughout the entire Sovinec territory, half empty and abandoned villages were resettled. In 1492 the related family of the Pňovskýs, represented by Lešek Pňovský of Sovinec, became landlords of Sovinec, and Ješek was the supreme judge. His son Vok lived in the times when all of Central Europe experienced a mining fever. Nízký Jeseník was invaded by an army of miners in search of gold and silver. Besides the local feudal searchers, the mining corporations headed by the Augsburg magnates Fugger, took part in the mining activities. Vok Pňovský and Marie of Austria, widow of King Louis, participated in the mining near the village Ruda and Plinkout. Vok, however, led his family to the verge of financial collapse. His son Ješek inherited the indebted lands and tried in vain to fill the treasury with newly mined gold and silver. In 1540 he was forced to sell Sovinec in 1543 to one of the richest Moravian magnates Kryštov of Boskovice and Třebová, who made it into a renaissance residence for his interest in acquiring the mountains full of various ores and existing machinery. Kryštov energy was not solely dedicated to mining, but also to colonial and industrial activities, continued by his grandson Jan, who not long before his death sold the Sovinec estate to Vavřinec Eder of Štiavnice in 1578. This owner also developed mining, especially iron ore, which reached its peak between the second half of the 16th and the beginning of the 17th centuries.

This era of peace and prosperity left its prints in the castle structures even today. The last lord of Sovinec, in the beginning of the 16th century, altered the central core of the castle by adding late gothic gate wings to it. Key examples of this architectural change are the Gothic gate which leads to the inner palace built in the castle's fifth courtyard, and the surrounding buildings, as shown in the engraved insignia of Ješek and Jan Pňovský. Under the Boskovics the Renaissance found its expression in the still existing portal leading to what is known as the Boskovický Hall. Vařinec Elder had the servants' wing built with two ornamental gates of Maletín sandstone.

Vařinec daughter Anna married son-in-law Jan the Elder Kobylka of Kobylí after her father's death. Her husband, a fervent Evangelical, having married a number of the rich Elder family, became one of the richest Moravian leaders and was able to climb the ladder of political career very rapidly. He thus became of the thirty Moravian directors which had the power to rule the region during the period of the Uprising of the Estates (before 1620). After the defeat in the Battle of the White Mountain, Jan the Elder Kobylka of Kobylí, based on his participation in the Bohemian Revolt, was forced to cede Sovinec on 18 January 1623 for a derisory sum to the new proconsul and vice-regent of Bohemia, Karl I, Prince of Liechtenstein, who committed it to the Teutonic Order in the same year. From his plain town home in Šternberk he looked with longing to the nearby mountains where in his beautiful and productive land ruled a new lord, one of those who, as a result of the White Mountain confiscations, controlled the vast properties in Northern Moravia and Silesia, and whose unlimited and severe administration found its definitive end only in 1945. With Kobylka ended the use of the Czech language which had prevailed in the Sovinec castle during the reign of the Boskovic and Elder dynasties. Feeble remainders of the Czech spirit existed only in the various documents and books in the castle archives, which also contained engravings of past Czech rulers' insignia and mottoes. The German administrative apparatus, had all Czech family as well as town and village names changed into German equivalents.

In 1626, during the Thirty Years' War, Sovinec fell into the hands of the Danish army under Ernst von Mansfeld. The administrator Klippel was captured and the castle and its surroundings pillaged. Upon his return, Klippel carried out fortification of the castle most intensely between 1642 and 1643 when Northern Moravia was invaded by the Swedish army under general Lennart Torstenson. Part of this fortification was a large round stone tower called "Lichteinsteinka" connected to the castle by an underground passage visible even today. When Tortenson besieged the castle in 1643, seeking a way from Uničov to Silesia, the importance of the fortification became clear. Half a month after the beginning of the siege, the brave defenders were forced to capitulate to a vast Swedish supremacy. The Swedes gained not only an important strategic position, which they held until the end of the war, but also an imposing treasure. After the Swedish withdrawal in 1650, the castle lost it military significance.

During the rule of Johann Caspar von Ampringen (1653–1664), the castle was reconstructed and maintained as the major stronghold of the Teutonic Order.

=== 18th to 21st century ===
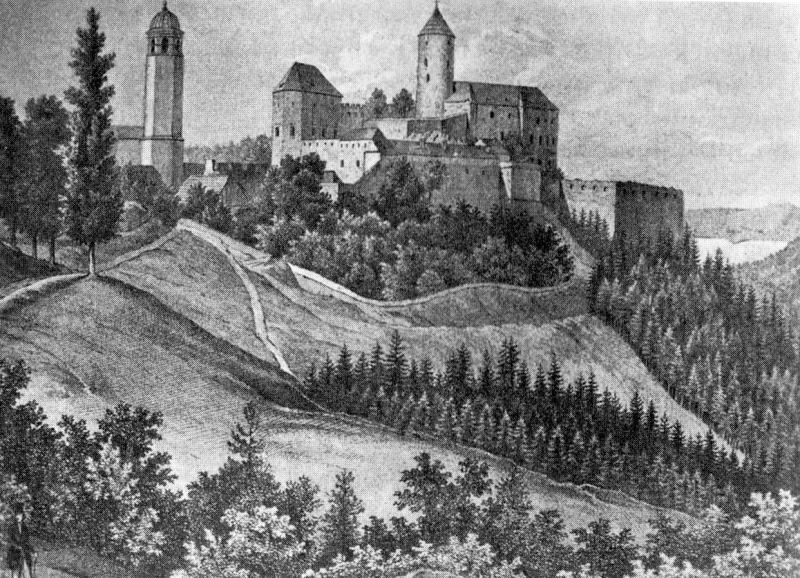
Drawing of Sovinec Castle in 1848 by F. A. Heber

The castle was partially renovated after a fire in 1784, but the damaged fortifications were never repaired, and all the subsequent wars passed it by. The Teutonic Order did not have an interest in expensive repairs on the castle, because in the 18th century the administration concentrated on its properties in Bruntál. Only in 1837 the High Templar had the castle repaired intending to hand it over to the Redemptorists. For some time it was the seat of a boys' seminarists school. In 1867 Sovinec was the seat of a school of forestry, which was moved into Hranice thirty years later. From then until the World War II, Sovinec became the summer seat of the Templar Order. Its museum contained mostly military objects and its large library counted more than 20,000 volumes.

The Nazis confiscated Sovinec as church property belonging to the Templars, who had in vain attempted to convince their German successors of their common goal. The darkest period in the history of Sovinec began then. It was turned into a prison, and since 1940 a number of French prisoners of war and antifascists were kept there. A special group of SS had its seat in Sovinec, and hermetically sealed the castle from the outside. Thus the activities of the castle in those last years of the occupation are covered by an impenetrable veil of secrecy and speculation. The truth about this particular period will never be revealed, because in the first days of May 1945 the castle burned down.

In 1951 rebuilding of the castle started. It lasted through the 60s and was interrupted several times so that the results were relatively small. The reconstruction went on in the second half of the 90s after the arrival of the new custodian Robert Rác. In 1991 the reconstruction of St. Augustine Church, the watchtower, and the southern wing was completed. The fronts of the entrance gate and the first and third courtyards were repaired as well as the housing units. A wine cellar was opened in the porter's lodge and a modern art gallery was established in the castle. The interior of the castle halls is under repair now. The former armory is to be turned into the castle library and also a general repair of the forestry school is intended for the future.

From the 1980s, the renowned Czech photographer Jindřich Štreit regularly organizes exhibitions, concerts and theatrical performances at the Sovinec Castle.

== Holders ==
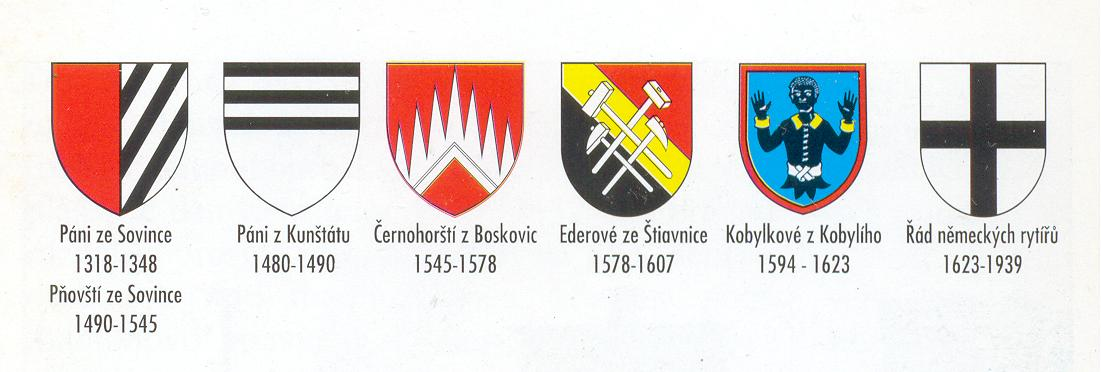
Sovinec Coat of Arms

- Pavel I of Sovinec 1318–1353
- Vok (I) of Sovinec 1318–1356
- Anežka (Vok's wife) 1353–?
- Klára (Pavel's wife)
- Pavlík of Sovinec 1353 – after 1398
- Warfare over the holding among Pavlík's sons: Aleš, Erhard, Proček, Pavel, Vok and Petr.
- 1409: Held jointly by:
  - Aleš of Sovinec
  - Erhard of Sovinec
  - Proček of Sovinec
  - Pavel, Vok and Petr (see below → Ješek ze Sovince receives Pňovice and founds the house of "Pňovští ze Sovince")
- Petr of Sovinec 1409 – before 1437
- Albert of Sovinec before 1437 – 1446 with:
  - Pavel II of Sovinec 1409 – after 1452
- Zikmund of Sovinec – after c. 1455 with:
  - Vok II of Sovinec 1409 – (only holder since c. 1455) – before 1475
  - Jaroslav of Sovinec before 1475 – ca.1480
  - Jan Heralt of Kunštát ca. 1480 – before 1490
  - Jan Pňovský of Sovinec before 1490 – 1508
- Heralt Pňovský of Sovinec 1508 – 1510 with:
  - Vok Pňovský of Sovinec 1508 – c. 1535
  - Ješek Pňovský of Sovinec c. 1535–1543
  - Kryštof of Boskovice 1543–1550
  - Jan Černohorský of Boskovice and Třebová 1550–1576
  - Vavřinec Eder of Štiavnice 1576–1590
  - Anna Ederovna of Štiavnice 1590–1607
  - Jan the Elder Kobylka of Kobylí 1594–1623
- 1623: Sold to Archduke Charles and the Teutonic Order
- 1919: The castle is transferred to Czechoslovakia
- 1924: Sovinec returned to the Order
- 1939: The belongings of the Order confiscated by Nazi Germany

== See also ==
- Bílá Hora
