= Silesian University in Opava =

Public university in the Czech Republic

- Slezská univerzita v Opavě
- Latin: Universitas Silesiana Opaviensis
- Other names: SU, SLU
- Motto: Quidquid discis, tibi discis
- Type: Public
- Established: 1991
- Rector: Tomas Gongol
- Academic staff: 301
- Students: 4,036
- Location: Opava, Czech Republic; 49°56′16″N 17°53′48″E
- Website: www.slu.cz

University rankings

Regional – Overall
- QS Emerging Europe and Central Asia: 231-240 (2022)

The Silesian University in Opava, (Czech: Slezská univerzita v Opavě) is a university offering tertiary education. It was established by the law (Nr. 314/199), adopted by the Czech National Council on 9 July 1991, making it one of the youngest universities in the Czech Republic.

In 1999 the Mathematical Institute in Opava was established after its separation from the Faculty of Philosophy and Science, and in 2008 several other institutes were separated from the same faculty and the Faculty of Public Policies in Opava was created.

The Silesian University in Opava has participated in the Erasmus Programme since 1999. The number of students and employees participating in the Erasmus Programme increased every year for the first 10 years.

== Faculties and Institutes ==
- Faculty of Philosophy and Science in Opava
- School of Business Administration in Karviná
- Faculty of Public Policies in Opava
- Institute of Mathematics in Opava
- Institute of Physics in Opava
- Institute of Creative Photography

== Sports ==
Location of the University of Silesia in Opava on the map of the Czech Republic

The university's sports union, Univerzitní sportovní klub (USK) operates inline skating, skiing, snowboarding, snag golf, cycling and kitesurfing. The university also has its own E-sports team, which participates in the National League of Legends League.

== Symbols ==
=== Seal ===
Its seal shows the coat of arms of Silesia, Opava is historical capital of Czech Silesia. Knowledge is symbolized by the book in the middle. It is surrounded by the inscription, Universitas Silesiana Opaviensis (English: Silesian University in Opava) and the year of its foundation, 1991, in Roman numerals: MCMXCI.

== Gallery ==
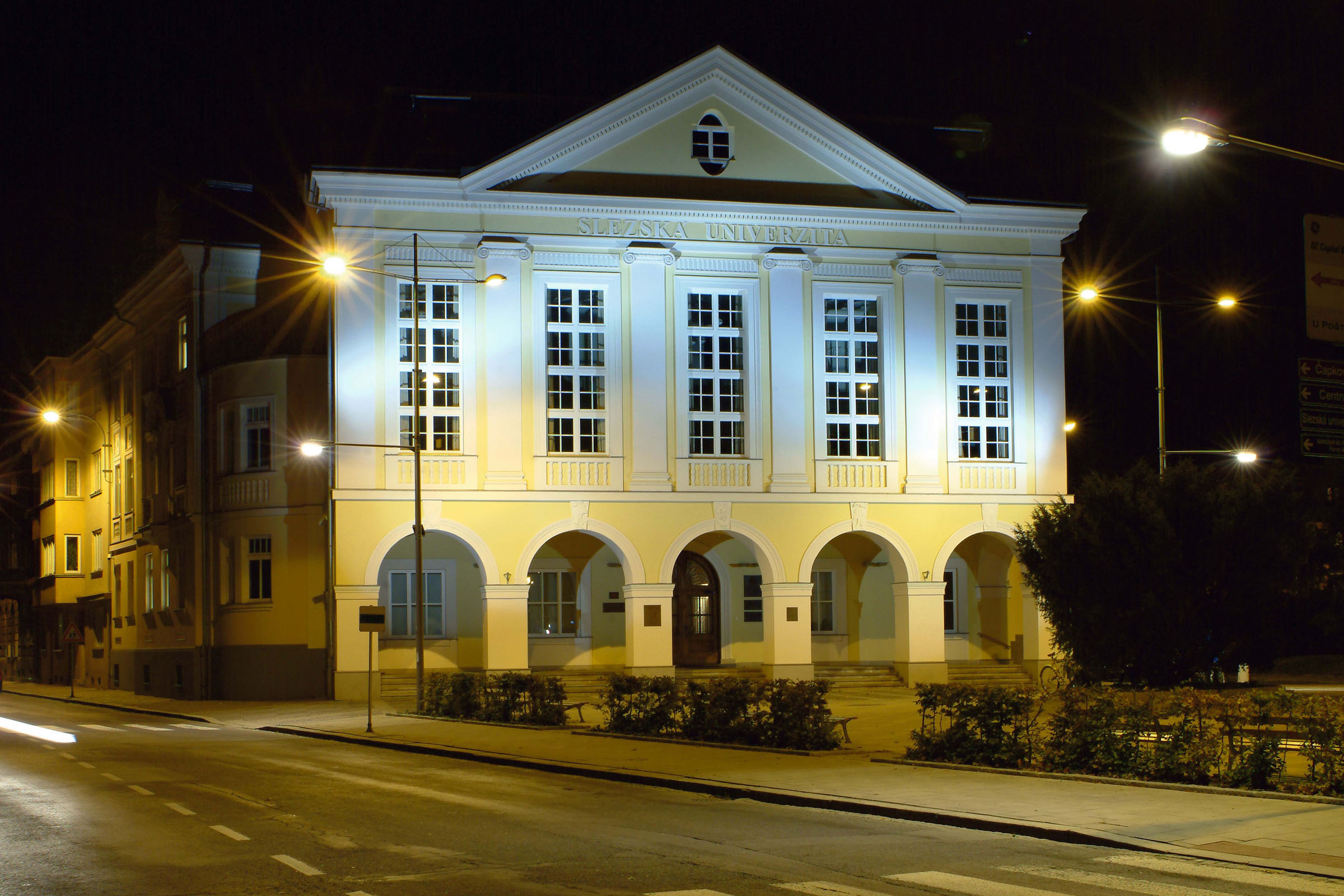
Main building of the university

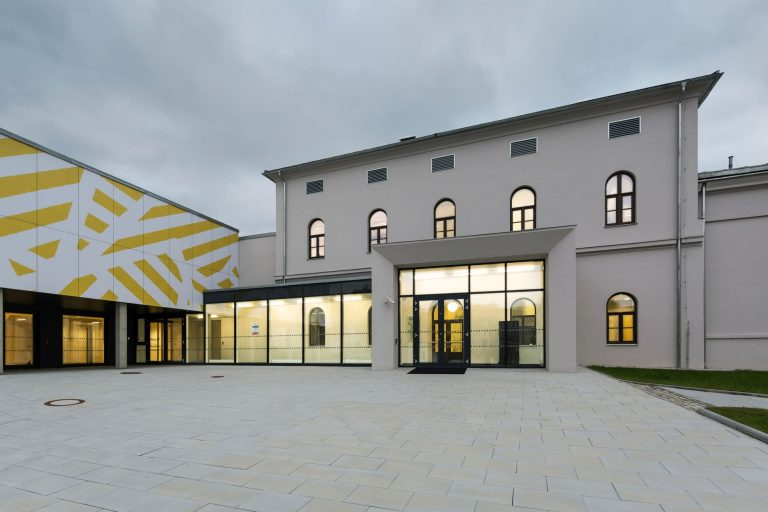
Hauerova Campus

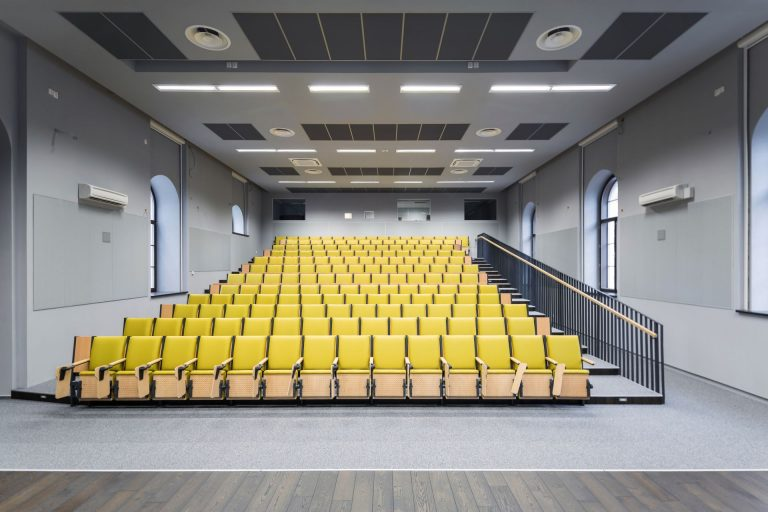
Film theater at Hauerova Campus

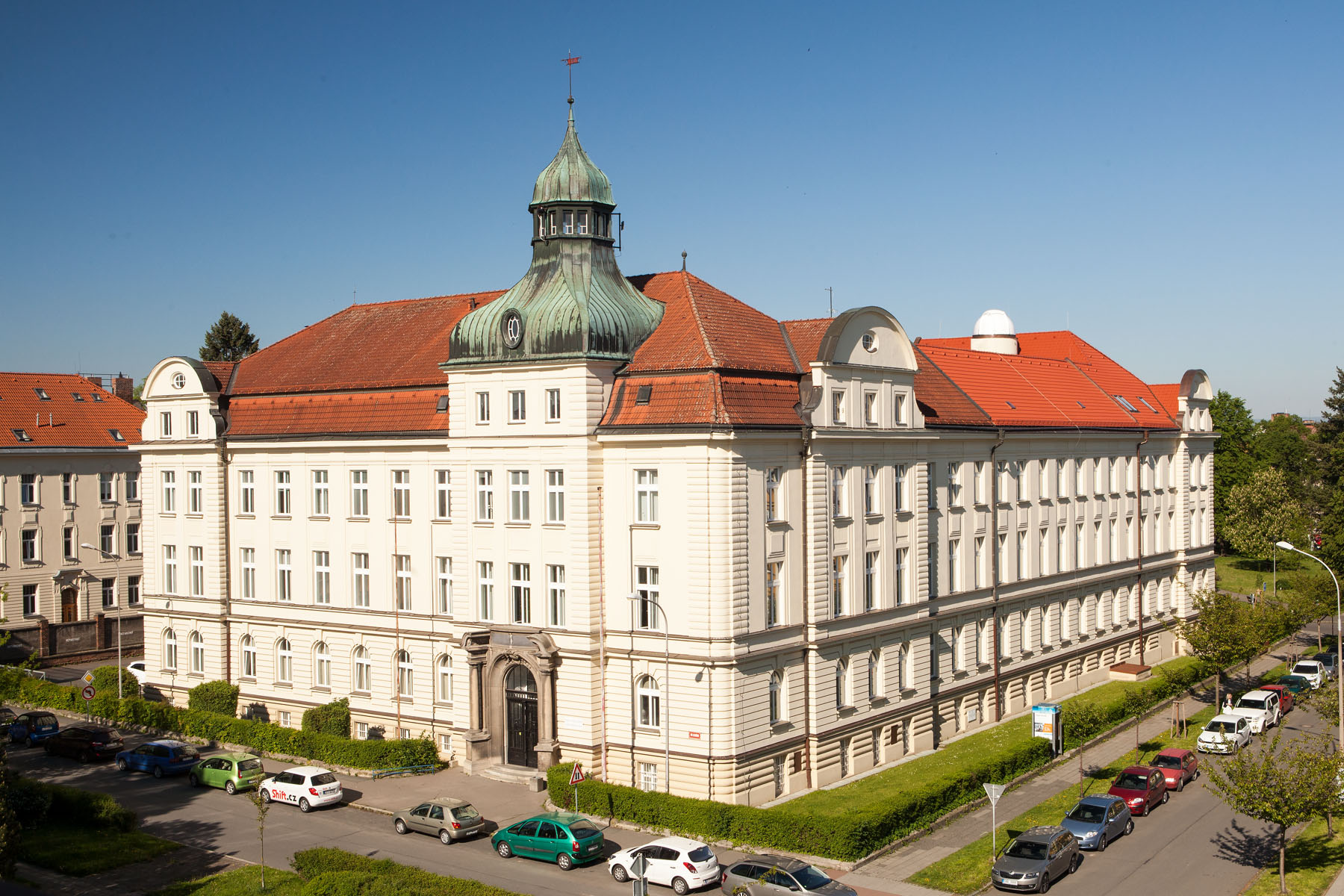
Bezručovo náměstí

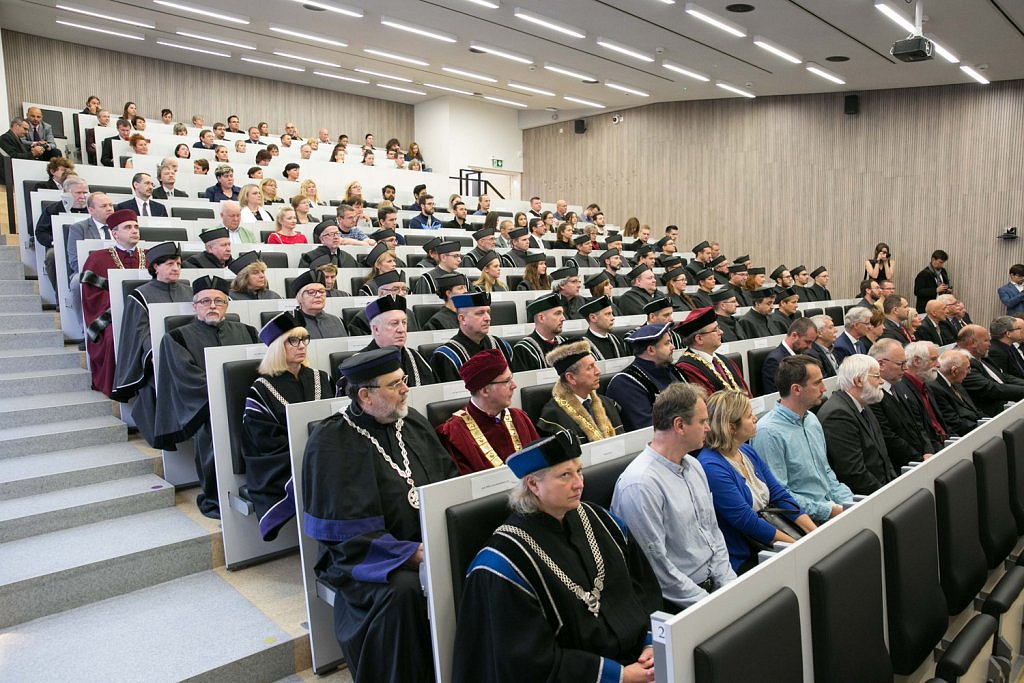
Alumni hall at Bezručovo náměstí

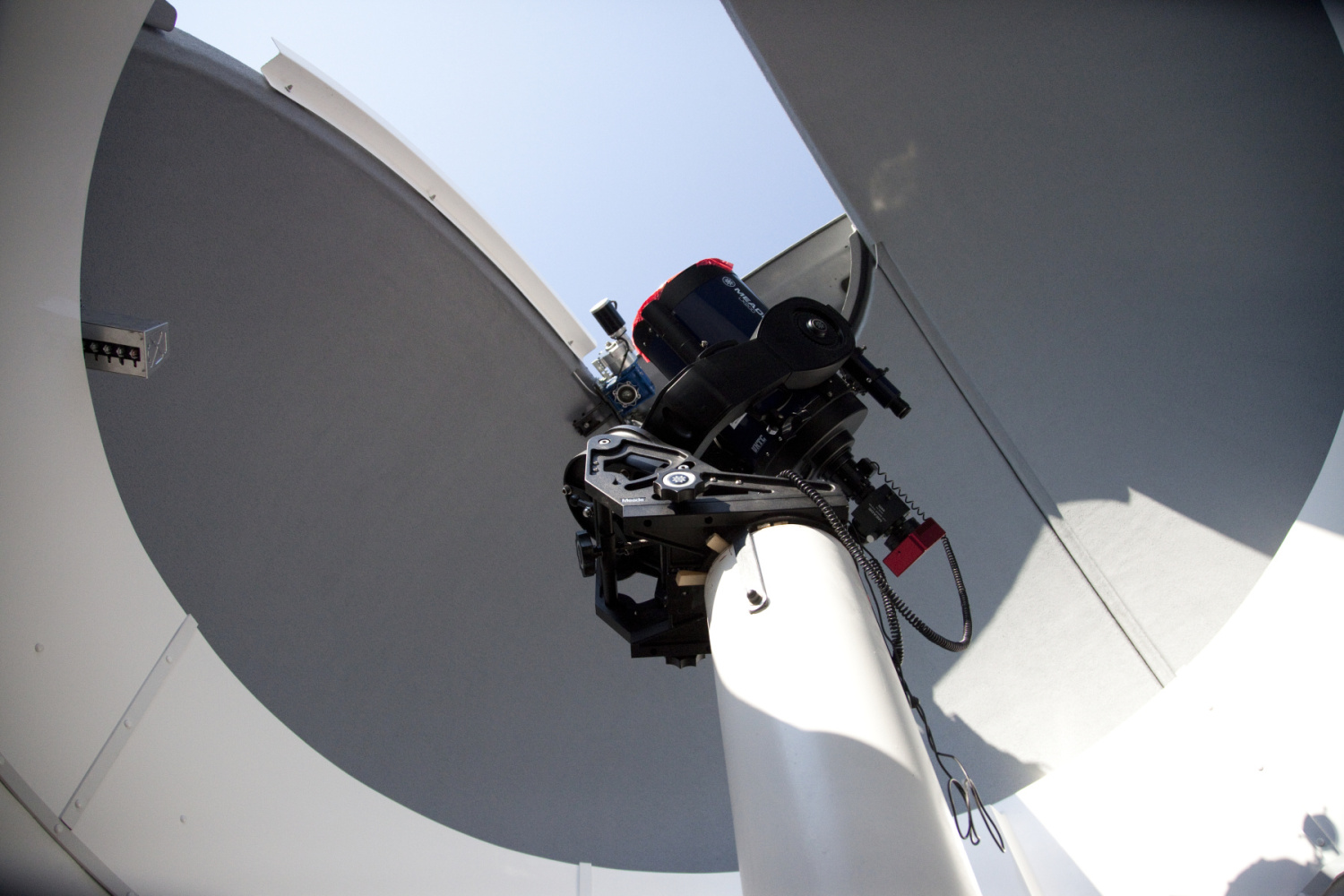
White Hole Observatory Opava

== See also ==
- Silesia Euroregion
