= Ciardi =

Ciardi is an Italian surname. Notable people with the surname include:

- Benedetta Ciardi (born 1971), Italian astrophysicist
- Beppe Ciardi (1875–1932), Italian painter
- Cesare Ciardi (1818–1877), Italian flautist and composer
- David Ciardi (born 1969), American astrophysicist
- Emma Ciardi (1879–1933), Italian painter
- Fabio Cifariello Ciardi (born 1960), Italian composer
- Francesca Ciardi (born 1954), Italian actress
- Guglielmo Ciardi (1842–1917), Italian painter
- John Ciardi (1916–1986), American poet, translator, and etymologist
- Mark Ciardi (born 1961), American film producer and baseball player
