= Andrea Ferrari =

Andrea Ferrari may refer to:

- Andrea Ferrari (footballer) (born 1986), Italian football goalkeeper
- Andrea Ferrari (sailor) (1915–2011), Italian Olympic sailor
- Andrea Carlo Ferrari (1850–1921), cardinal of the Roman Catholic Church and Archbishop of Milan from 1894 to his death
- Andrea C. Ferrari (born 1972), Italian professor of nanotechnology
- Andrea Ferrari (diplomat), ambassador of Italy to Canada

== See also ==
- Andrea Ferrara (disambiguation)
