= Jaya Baloo =

Dutch cybersecurity expert

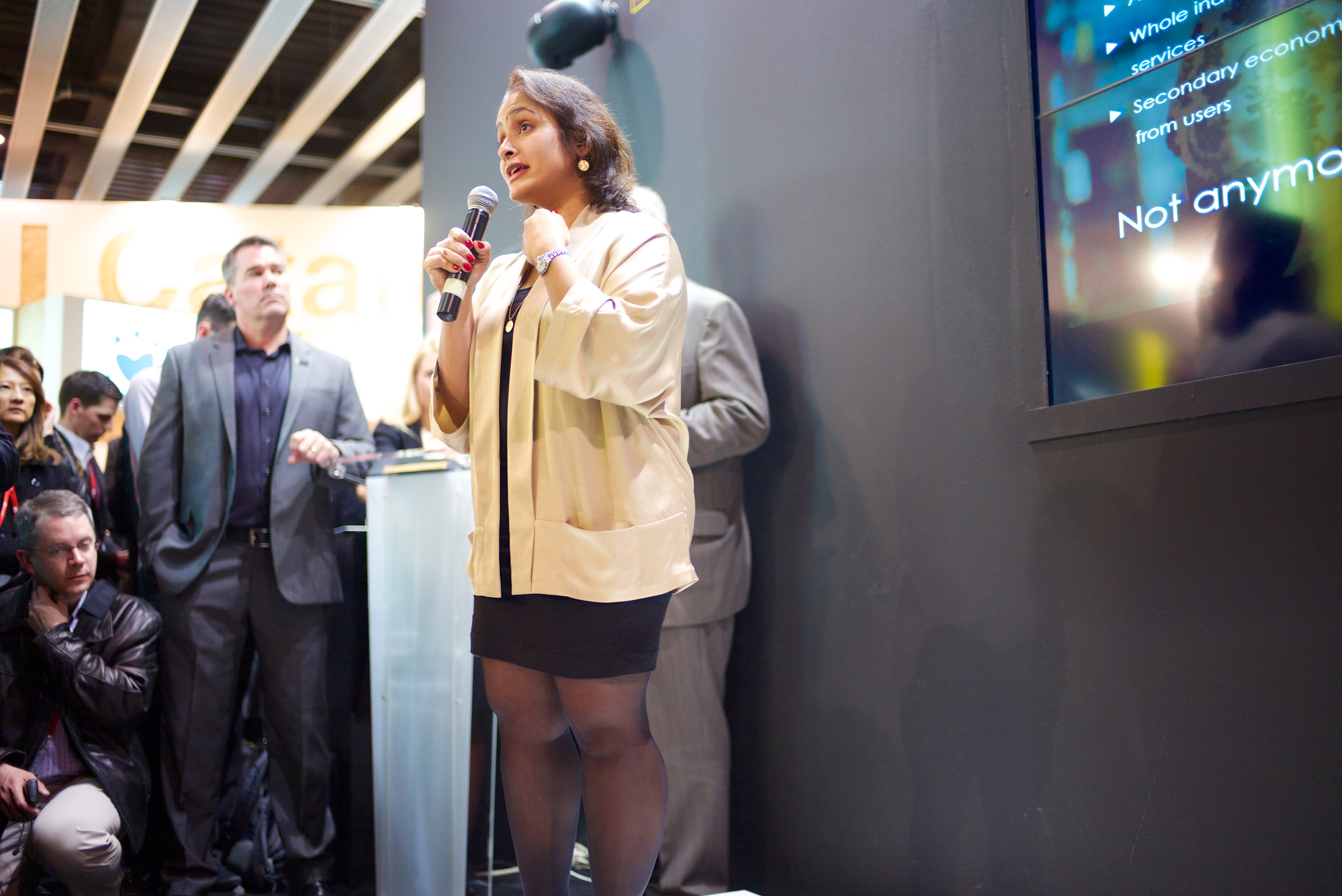
- Education: Tufts University
- Occupation: Chief Information Security Officer at Avast

Jaya Baloo is a cybersecurity expert who is currently the Chief Information Security Officer (CISO) and Chief Operating Officer at Aisle . Baloo was named one of the top 100 CISO's in 2017 and one of the Forbes 100 Women Founders in Europe To Follow in 2018.

== Career ==
Baloo studied at Tufts University between 1991 and 1995. She was inspired to study computers after receiving one for Christmas at the age of nine. Baloo's first job was working at a bank dealing with export cryptography problems. She was surprised at how cryptography was treated as a "weapon," with the USA hiding their security advances from the rest of the world. She had an interest in understanding the difference between mistakes in programming and malicious activity. After moving to The Netherlands, Baloo became a network services engineer and consultant at KPN International Consultancy before specialising in fraud and revenue assurance for France Telecom between 2005 and 2009. Baloo then worked at Verizon for nearly 4 years. Baloo believes that the goal of telecommunications attackers is not to bring down services but to shape and intercept traffic without discovery, notably different from attacks on other critical infrastructure like energy or water.

In 2012, Baloo became the Chief Information Security Officer (CISO) at KPN Telecom, a Dutch internet service provider, in the same year that KPN was hacked. During this time, Baloo was chairman of the Dutch Continuity Board, which is a collaboration tackling denial-of-service (DDoS) cyberthreats through exchanging live attack information between competitors. In an interview with the podcast Cybersecurity Dispatch, it was highlighted that Baloo's length of tenure at KPN was considerably longer than the 18-month to 2-year average. She was named one of the top 100 CISOs in 2017, with only 9 other women named. In 2018, Forbes named Baloo as one of the 100 Women Founders in Europe To Follow.

In October 2019 Baloo took on her current role as CISO for Avast. One reason why she joined Avast is her love of their mission to ensure "that cybersecurity is a fundamental right. It’s not just for people who can afford to pay for a product – it's for everyone".

Baloo holds a faculty position at Singularity University. She is also a quantum ambassador for KPN Telecom and Vice Chair of the Quantum Flagship Strategic Advisory Board of the EU Commission. She considers quantum computers as inevitable tools that will disrupt current computing architectures, recommending that businesses and organisations prepare themselves for the impact of new quantum protocols. Among her recommendations are to increase the key length of current algorithms, use quantum key distribution in niche parts of the network, and look at post quantum cryptographic algorithms. Baloo projects that the most exciting development in quantum communication will be beyond the current point-to-point into many-to-many, on demand, instantly. This requires quantum repeaters and other architecture in a managed service, which Baloo predicts could be achieved in 5–10 years' time.

During the COVID-19 pandemic, Baloo has been providing tips for best home working practices on behalf of Avast.

In March 2023, Baloo was appointed as CISO at Rapid7.

She is a member of the supervisory board of NOS, one of the broadcasting organisations making up the Dutch public broadcasting system.

== Interests and views ==
Baloo is interested in the future of cybersecurity and how quantum computing may impact privacy. She is an expert in network architecture, security weaknesses in mobile and voice-over-IP, cryptography, and quantum communication networks. In 2019, the non-profit Inspiring Fifty selected Baloo as one of the fifty most inspiring women in the Netherlands.

Baloo considers inequality and distribution of assets as one of the biggest global cyberthreats, with only a handful of countries able to detect, respond to, or defend against threats. On quantum computing, Baloo comments:

"You see that happening at Microsoft, at Google, at IBM, the United States is investing heavily in it [quantum computing], China has billions of dollars in it...But the rest of the world certainly doesn’t. You’re not hearing of a quantum computer or post-quantum cryptography being developed in Brazil or in Kenya. What I’m worried about from an infosec point of view, is that when we have a quantum computer, it’s going to effectively render our current encryption schemes for public key cryptography moot....So if we see an evolution where only certain countries will be able to possess this kind of technology, all of the other countries will be in this ‘digital divide’ that the UN always talks about."

Baloo's advice for women in cybersecurity is to "Hold onto your passion, and don't shut yourself down. We need you in this industry. Help us keep the world safe".

== Personal life ==
Baloo has three children. In her spare time she enjoys diving, having dived at the Great Barrier Reef and in the Bahamas, and would consider becoming a diving instructor as an alternative occupation. Baloo is also training for a pilot license.
