= Andrea Ferrara =

Andrea Ferrara may refer to:

- Andrew Ferrara (c. 1530–1612), Italian bladesmith
- Andrea Ferrara (jurist) (1882–1954), Italian jurist
- Andrea Ferrara (astrophysicist) (born 1961), Italian astrophysicist

== See also ==
- Andrea Ferrari (disambiguation)
