= Avast One =

Cybersecurity software

- Developer: Avast Software s.r.o. (a Gen company)
- Release: September 16, 2021
- Operating system: Windows, macOS, Android, iOS
- Type: Antivirus software
- License: Freemium (proprietary)
- Website: avast.com/avast-one

Avast One is a consumer cybersecurity and privacy platform developed by Avast, a software brand owned by Gen. First released on September 16, 2021, Avast One includes antivirus, VPN, device-performance, and identity/privacy-monitoring tools (previously sold as separate products such as Avast Antivirus, Avast SecureLine VPN, and Avast Cleanup) into a single application managed from one dashboard. The product has since gone through several redesigns, including the addition of a premium identity-protection tier, Avast One Platinum in 2023, and a "Silver" tier in 2024. Avast launched a new à la carte version of the app in May 2026.

== History ==
=== Launch ===
Avast One was announced on September 16, 2021, as an integrated service intended to combine antivirus protection with privacy and performance tools that Avast had previously sold separately. At launch, the product was offered in three versions: Avast One Essential (free), and two paid tiers: Avast One Individual and Avast One Family. Avast One Essential (free) included: antivirus protection, a firewall, Ransomware Shield, a data-breach monitoring feature, a PC Speedup tool, a software updater, and a VPN allowance of 5 gigabytes per week. Testing by AV-Test at launch gave Avast One a maximum score of six out of six points for both protection and performance impact. In November 2021, PCMag named Avast One Essential an Editors' Choice pick, describing it as incorporating the technology that had made Avast's antivirus products well known while adding features drawn from the broader Avast One suite.

=== Expansion and Avast One Premium ===
Avast added a series of features to Avast One across Windows, macOS, Android, and iOS, including Email Guardian (scam and phishing detection for email), a Privacy Advisor tool, Network Inspector for home Wi-Fi scanning, Bank Mode (an isolated virtual desktop for online banking), and an Online Safety Score feature. On March 9, 2023, Avast introduced Avast One Platinum, a premium tier that layered identity-theft monitoring and restoration services on top of the existing Avast One Family plan. Platinum added dark-web and social-media monitoring, three-bureau credit report monitoring, lost-wallet protection, 24/7 technical support, and identity-theft reimbursement of up to $2 million, underwritten by Hamilton Insurance DAC; the plan launched for up to six family members and 30 devices. In April 2024, Avast introduced a fourth tier, Avast One Silver, positioned between the free tier and the more comprehensive Gold and Platinum plans. Silver let subscribers add individual modules—such as an unlimited VPN, driver and software updaters, or a Web Hijack Guard feature—rather than purchasing a full bundle. By this point the product’s naming had shifted from the original Essential/Individual/Family scheme to Basic, Silver, Gold, and Platinum tiers. Reviewing the Gold tier in 2024, TechRadar described Avast One Gold as covering up to five devices for an introductory price of $6.99 per month ($83.88 billed annually), renewing at $14.99 per month ($179.99 annually), and comparable to competing suites such as Bitdefender Premium Security and Norton 360 Deluxe.

=== 2026 redesign ===
On May 19, 2026, Gen Digital relaunched Avast One with a modular, "à la carte" structure intended to replace the earlier fixed-tier bundles. The free base version provides "Free Antivirus" (antivirus and real-time threat protection, including scam website blocking), "Free Cleanup" (removal of unneeded files), and "Free BreachGuard" (data breach monitoring and tracking protection). The free version also includes a 60-day trial of Avast SecureLine VPN. Free and paid versions include a new "AI Agent Protection" feature called “Sage." "Sage" protects users by looking for malicious language that targets AI workflows in tools like OpenClaw and Claude Code. Additional protections can be added individually rather than purchased as part of a larger package.

Several paid upgrades are available alongside the free base. Avast Premium Security adds protection against scam emails, webcam protection, and remote-access-attack protection. Cleanup Premium offers additional PC and Mac tuning capabilities intended to minimize crashes and increase performance. BreachGuard Premium and SecureLine VPN are also available as upgrades. Gen Digital said existing subscribers to the earlier version of Avast One would continue to be supported and could migrate to the new app.

== Features ==
Avast One's feature set is available a la carte. Features are grouped into several categories:

- Device protection — includes real-time antivirus and anti-malware scanning, a firewall, Ransomware Shield, Web Guard (which blocks access to malicious and phishing websites), Network Inspector for scanning home Wi-Fi networks for vulnerabilities, and Smart Scan, a short automated scan for malware and performance issues.
- Online privacy — includes Avast SecureLine VPN, BreachGuard data-breach monitoring a password-breach checker, and tools to review and adjust privacy settings on other online accounts.
- Performance — a PC Speedup / Cleanup utility, a software updater.
- AI protections — SMS and Call Guard. provides AI scam protection to phones and tablets; Deepfake Guard, proactively identifies malicious and manipulated imagery and videos.

Past paid tiers included webcam protection, an automatic driver updater, Web Hijack Guard, and—in the Platinum tier—full identity-theft monitoring and restoration services. TechRadar's reviewers noted that Avast One's installer flags unfamiliar applications and can pause their execution for up to a minute while files are analyzed by Avast's Threat Labs, a more cautious approach than some competing products take toward unrecognized software.

== Reception ==
=== Independent lab testing ===
Avast One's core antivirus engine has repeatedly scored well in tests by independent laboratories. AV-Test's Home Windows report in December 2024 gave Avast a perfect 6-out-of-6 score across protection, performance, and usability. AV-Comparatives' September 2024 summary gave Avast Free Antivirus a 95.8 percent online detection rate and an "Advanced" rating. Reviewing the redesigned app in 2026, Tom's Guide cited AV-Test's February 2026 report rating Avast a "Top Product" with a 6/6 score, an AV-Comparatives April 2026 test ranking Avast sixth overall with a 90-out-of-100 protection score and a system-impact score of 5.5, and an SE Labs UK report from April 2026 awarding Avast its highest AAA rating with 100 percent total accuracy.

=== Critical reception ===
Reviews of Avast One have generally been positive, with reviewers highlighting its breadth of features relative to competitors while noting that some tools are reserved for higher-priced tiers. TechRadar stated that the free tier delivered stronger antivirus protection than many paid competitors. TechRadar also stated that users only interested in antivirus scanning might prefer Avast Free Antivirus. Following the May 2026 redesign, Gizmodo described the new Avast One as delivering "free protection that is actually good, with paid add-ons that are genuinely optional," contrasting it with security suites that limit free tiers to encourage upgrades. Tom's Guide's 2026 review called the product's protection "fantastic" overall, while noting drawbacks including the restriction of the unlimited VPN to the top-priced tier and the paywalling of some features.

== See also ==
- Avast
- Avast Antivirus
- AVG AntiVirus
- AVG Technologies
- Gen Digital
