= Tuneup =

Tuneup may refer to:

- Tune Up!, an album by Don Patterson
- Tune-Up!, a 1972 album by Sonny Rollins
- Service (motor vehicle)
- AVG PC TuneUp
