= Avast Premium VPN =

Virtual private network provider

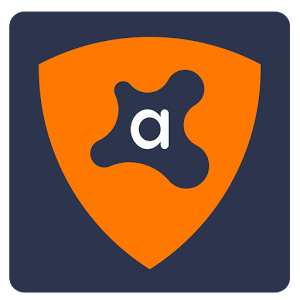

- Avast Premium VPN for Windows 10 and Windows 11.
- Developer: Avast
- Operating system: Android, Microsoft Windows, macOS, iOS, Android TV
- Platform: Personal Computer, Smartphone, Smart TV, Apple TV
- Available in: 24 languages
- Type: Virtual private network
- License: Proprietary software
- Website: Avast Premium VPN

Avast Premium VPN (formerly Avast SecureLine VPN) is a VPN service developed by Czech cybersecurity software company Avast. It is available for Android, Microsoft Windows, macOS and iOS operating systems and through the Avast One app. A late 2026 refresh of the app announced new features including double VPN, IP rotation, and VPN pause features. It was renamed in 2026 from "Avast SecureLine VPN" to "Avast Premium VPN."

The VPN can be set to automatically turn on when the user connects to a public Wi-Fi.

== Functionality ==
Similar to other VPNs, Avast Premium VPN works by making the user appear in a different place via changing the user's IP address, bypassing internet censorship for the country the user is in or Wi-Fi the user is using. The VPN can be set to automatically turn on when the user connects to a public Wi-Fi, uses torrent apps, uses banking websites or apps, or streaming videos.

Security features of Avast Premium VPN include: 256-bit Advanced Encryption Standard, single shared IP, DNS leak protection, kill switch, and Smart Connection Rules. Split tunneling is available. Protocols include WireGuard, OpenVPN and Mimic.

In 2026, Avast added an option for a "double VPN" (aka "multi-hop") routing traffic through two VPN servers to provide an extra layer of protection. The update also added the ability for users to select "IP rotation" that automatically selects a new IP address as frequently as every 30 seconds, making it more difficult for third parties to track users by associating activities with one fixed IP address.

The 2026 refresh also added an option to activate post-quantum encryption. Post-quantum encryption uses an updated encryption algorithm that is designed to keep data safe, even if future quantum computing advances allow older encryption algorithms to be broken. This protects against "harvest now, decrypt later" attacks based on quantum computing.

== Server locations ==
As of the late 2026 update, Avast has increased the number of egress servers to cover more than 100 locations world-wide. Servers in eight cities support P2P connections for protocols like BitTorrent and further servers are dedicated to users of streaming services.

== Privacy ==
As of May 2026, Avast claims that there is no logging of IP, DNS, or transferred data. Its policy states that server metadata (location, protocol, server IP) is stored for 18 months, and that connection data is stored for 12 months. The company publishes a quarterly transparency report publishing the data requests received for VPN users.

== See also ==
- Avast Antivirus
- Avast Secure Browser
- VPN service
- Information privacy
- Internet privacy
