= Betto Lotti =

Italian painter and engraver

Benedetto (Betto) Lotti
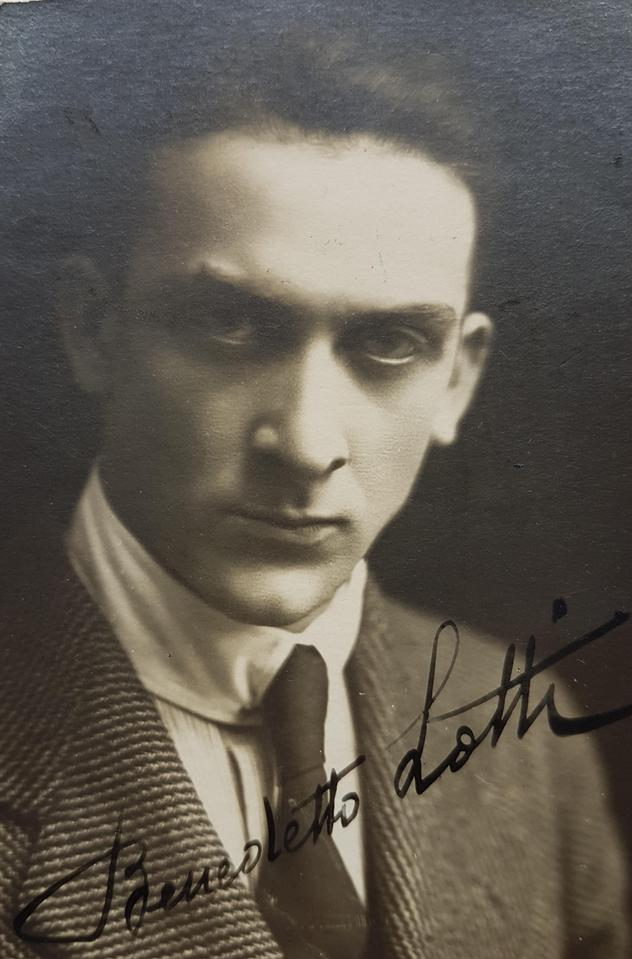
- Born: Benedetto (Betto) Lotti; 1894; Taggia, Liguria, Italy
- Died: 1977 (aged 82–83); Como, Lombardy, Italy
- Known for: Painting, Engraving

… In the changing moments of eternity, I have been trying to seize the landscape of our land, made of spirituality and kindness, full of infinite faces continuously longing for love . That is the true heart of my work..

— Betto Lotti, Memorie

Benedetto (Betto) Lotti (Taggia, July 12, 1894 - Como, 1977) was an Italian painter and engraver who belonged to the art movement called Novecento Italiano.

== Family and early life ==
Betto Lotti was the son of Vincenzo, art teacher, headmaster and painter, and Vittoria dei Marchesi Curlo, both coming from the region of Liguria. Due to fact that his father was working for the state, the family was constrained to move constantly and the young man had to attend schools in different Italian cities. He began his studies in Porto Maurizio (Imperia), and then at the Art School in Venice. He was a student of such well-known painters as Guglielmo Ciardi and Ettore Tito. Later on the family moved to Bologna and finally to Florence, where Lotti, a student of great masters, finished his studies.

== The Florence years ==
The young Betto Lotti dedicated himself to mastering his style, especially in charcoal drawing, oil painting and engravings at the Academy of Florence; therein he met Ottone Rosai who became his great friend, and with whom he shared the enthusiasm and experience of the period between 1911 and 1914. In 1913 the two young artists held together their first exhibition at the Cavour Gallery in Florence, displaying 14 paintings each. The fathers of Futurism, Filippo Tommaso Marinetti, Carlo Carrà e Umberto Boccioni attended the exhibition and were impressed by the works of young artists. After this episode the Florentine chronicles started to show profound interest in the two young people. The success both with critics and audience was remarkable. In the works displayed, Lotti opted for stylised female figures that seemed almost visions or ghosts, intrepid somber backgrounds, disturbing reflections of profiles and faces. The expressionist style of the young artists was defined by some critics of Florentine art as "sensibilism".

== Engravings ==
In the technical realization of the etchings, honed during the years of the academy, Betto Lotti showed an untimely natural inclination. His first collective exhibitions received praise. He was awarded the Second Prize from the Ministry of Education in Florence in 1912. The activity lasted for about a decade and culminated in 1922, when Lotti was selected among the artists featured at the Exhibition of Tuscan engravers in Montreal, Canada.

== The Great War ==
Betto Lotti was drafted into the army and, in early 1915 sent to the front where he remained until he was wounded and imprisoned. In June 1917 he was interned in the concentration camp of Sigmundserberg in Austria but, despite detention, he resumed drawing and was even appreciated by the enemy's authorities. He was soon invited to create an exhibition of his works of art in Vienna. The exhibition was a great success both with public and critics, and all the works were sold out.

== Return to Florence ==
After being repatriated in September 1918, Lotti returned to Florence with the intention to go back to work as soon as possible. He was in fact hired as a designer and modeler of plastiques at the Military Geographic Institute of Florence; he started teaching art subjects and creating sets for the performances at the Municipal Theatre in Florence, but above all, he set up a long and fruitful activity in the field of journalism, working with the newspaper "La Nazione" and writing art critiques. Throughout the following decade Lotti intensified this activity, in particular with the magazine "Gran Bazar", and after adopting "Eclettica", Lotti became its first co-director and then director for some period of time. These were the years of great cultural upheaval (Lotti was attending an artistic caffè of Red Coats where he met his old friends, great writers and artists such as Ottone Rosai, Achille Lega, Giovanni Papini, Soffici and Bruno Fallaci. He was involved in a wide range of activities and mastered his skills in various forms of art, both in Italy and abroad. He started creating billboards for the French company Vercasson Paris. These images, in particular Lotti Clowns (as they have been nicknamed) became a part of vintage poster network, bringing Lotti international fame.

== The landing in Lombardy ==
In 1934 Lotti received a teaching position and had to abandon "his" Florence in order to move to Lombardy, the region which has remained his home. After two years in Stradella (Pavia), he moved to Como. He married Professor Angiola Faravelli and they had two daughters. Surrounded by magnificent lake, Lotti carried on teaching with great commitment, while dedicating himself to art. He established profound friendship with abstract artists of "Gruppo Como" such as Rho, Radice, Galli and Badiali, and while not adhering to radical theories of the rationalists, he shared his experience and discoveries with them. The maturity of the artist reached its peak in those decades, confirming the full membership of Betto Lotti in Italian art movement, born in the twenties and defined as Novecento. The main themes, especially in oil paintings, were the landscape and open spaces, drawn with a warm poetic vision that transformed them in spiritual places.

In the last decade of his life, Lotti's commitment as an artist and his participation in collective and solo exhibitions were very active. Betto Lotti died in Como on April 13, 1977, at the age of nearly 83 years.

== The Work of Art ==
Betto Lotti has left an indelible imprint of great value during more than forty years spent in Como: from 1934 to 1977, he participated in almost all collective exhibitions held in Lombardy, such as Suzzara Prize or the Angelicum in Milan; he organized solo exhibitions in almost all the cities of Lombardy (Milan, Bergamo, Lecco, Varese, Como, to name a few ); as an illustrator, he participated in the contest for the poster of Visconti Castle of Pavia in 1937, where he won the first prize; He was one of the founders and the vice president of the Fine Arts Association in Como; he won numerous awards, gold medals and diplomas in his field, the list of which can be found in the artist's official monograph; he was appointed a member of important institutions of the world of art, for example of La Permanente in Milan in 1946, Academia Latinitati Excolendae of Rome in 1959 and Academia Tiberina in Rome in 1960. He was awarded the Order of Merit for Culture and Art by The Ministry of Education in 1963. The President Saragat appointed him Knight of the Republic in 1965.
