= Andrea Ferrara (astrophysicist) =

Italian theoretical astrophysicist

- Born: 29 March 1961 (age 65)
- Employer: Scuola Normale Superiore

Andrea Ferrara (born 29 March 1961) is an Italian theoretical astrophysicist and science communicator.

He is considered one of the top 100 Italian scientists in the field of astrophysics. and he is a professor of cosmology at the Scuola Normale Superiore, where he served as president of the Classe di Scienze (Faculty of Science) from 2018 to 2024, until he was succeeded by Angelo Vistoli.

== Career ==
He graduated in physics in 1988 from the University of Pisa and he obtained a Ph.D. in astronomy in 1992 from the University of Florence.

In 2007 he was the supervisor of the doctoral dissertation of Simona Gallerani.

In 2008 he was awarded the honorary Blaauw Professorship, from the Kapteyn Astronomical Institute and Groningen University

In 2012 he got the Beatrice M. Tinsley Centennial Visiting Professorship in Astronomy at the University of Texas at Austin.

In 2015 he was a member of the board of directors and also President of the Visiting Committee for radioastronomy of INAF.

In 2018 he was associated editor for Italy of the journal Astronomy & Astrophysics together with Steven Shore and Sergio Campana

n 2018 he was granted one the 100 Humboldt Research Awards by the Alexander von Humboldt Foundation, sponsored by Michela Andreani and Benedetta Ciardi.The related fellowship started in September 2019.

In 2021 he became a member of the Science and Engineering Advisory Committee (SEAC) of the Square Kilometre Array Observatory.

== Research ==
Professor Ferrara conducts theoretical and numerical research on the formation, properties and evolution of cosmic structures such as galaxies and black holes during the early stages of the Universe after the Big Bang.

In 2022 he secured with colleagues Simona Gallerani e Andrei Mesinger 187 observation hours at the James Webb Space Telescope within the international "PRIMER" project.

== Personal life ==
Andrea Ferrara is also active as an electronic music composer, and he performs under the pseudonym Ongakuaw.

== Honors and awards ==
- 2008 Blaauw professor, Kapteyn Astronomical Institute, University of Groningen
- 2012 Beatrice M. Tinsley Centennial Visiting Professorship at University of Texas at Austin
