= Simona Gallerani =

Italian cosmologist

- Born: 1977 (age 48–49); Bari, Italy
- Education: University of Padua International School for Advanced Studies
- Known for: Research on the structure of galaxies and active galactic nuclei, especially in the early universe
- Awards: Livio Gratton Prize (2009)
- Scientific career
- Fields: Observational cosmology
- Workplaces: Scuola Normale Superiore di Pisa (associate professor)
- Doctoral advisor: Andrea Ferrara

Simona Gallerani (born 1977) is an Italian observational cosmologist whose research focuses on the structure of galaxies and active galactic nuclei, especially in the early universe. She is an associate professor of astronomy and astrophysics at the Scuola Normale Superiore di Pisa.

== Education ==
Gallerani was born in Bari, in 1977. After earning a laureate at the University of Padua, she completed a Ph.D. in astrophysics at the International School for Advanced Studies (SISSA) in Trieste. Her 2007 doctoral dissertation, Reionization signatures in quasar absorption spectra, was supervised by Andrea Ferrara. It won the biennial Livio Gratton Prize of the Eta Carinae Association for the best dissertation in astronomy or astrophysics at an Italian institution.

== Publications ==
A 2016 publication of Gallerani and others on quasars gained attention from NASA and the media for its team of authors, all six being Italian women astrophysicists.

The same six authors reunited in 2019 to write an Italian astronomy book for children, Apri gli occhi al cielo [Open your eyes to the sky], which was a finalist for the 2020 National Award for Scientific Dissemination, in the category of scientific outreach for children.
