= CitizenM Boston North Station =

Hotel in Boston, Massachusetts, U.S.

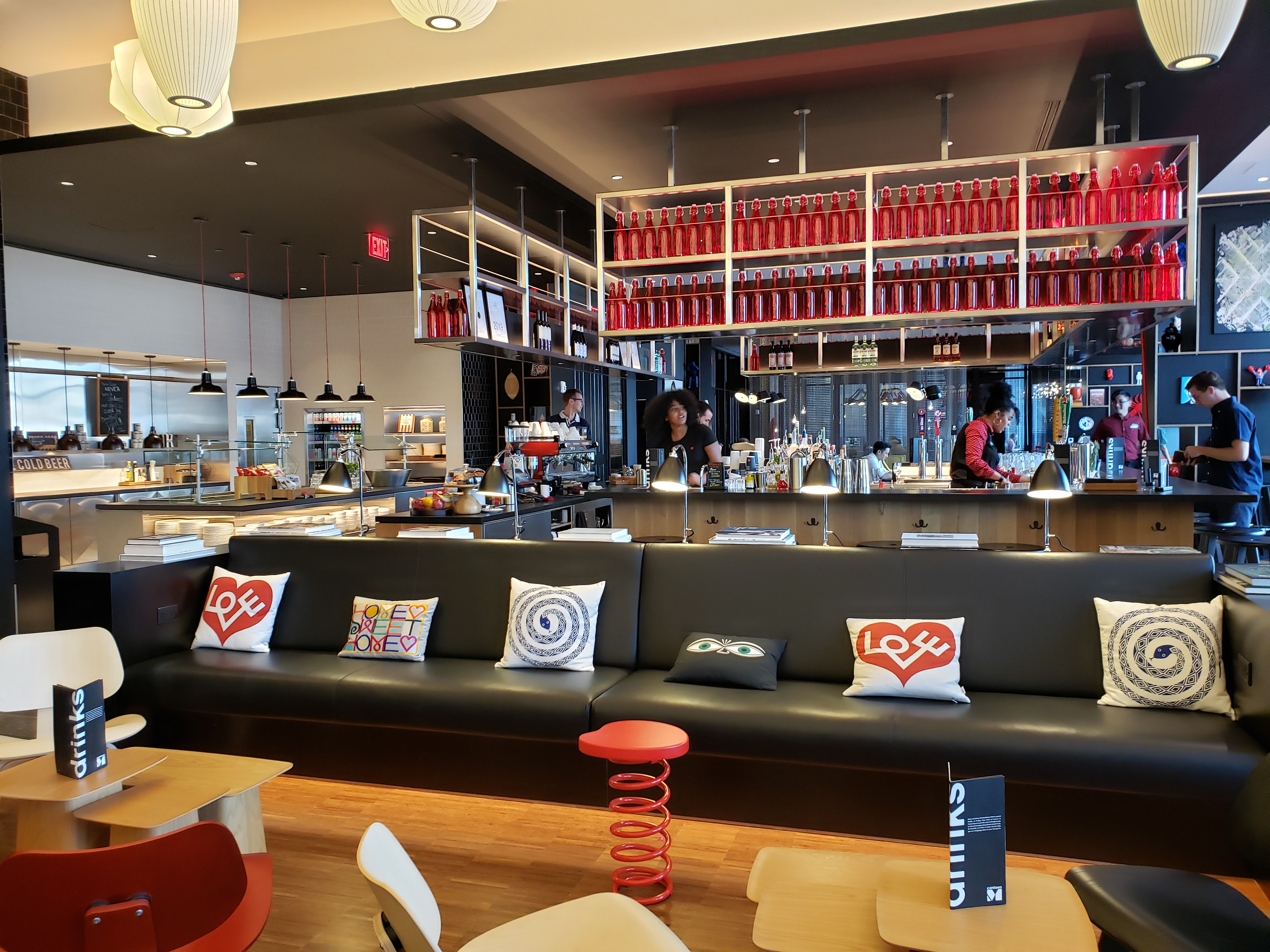
- Common area, 2019

General information
- Location: 70 Causeway Street, Boston MA 02114, Boston, Massachusetts, United States
- Coordinates: 42.3654°N 71.0621°W

CitizenM Boston North Station is a CitizenM hotel in Boston's West End, Boston, in the United States.

== Description and history ==
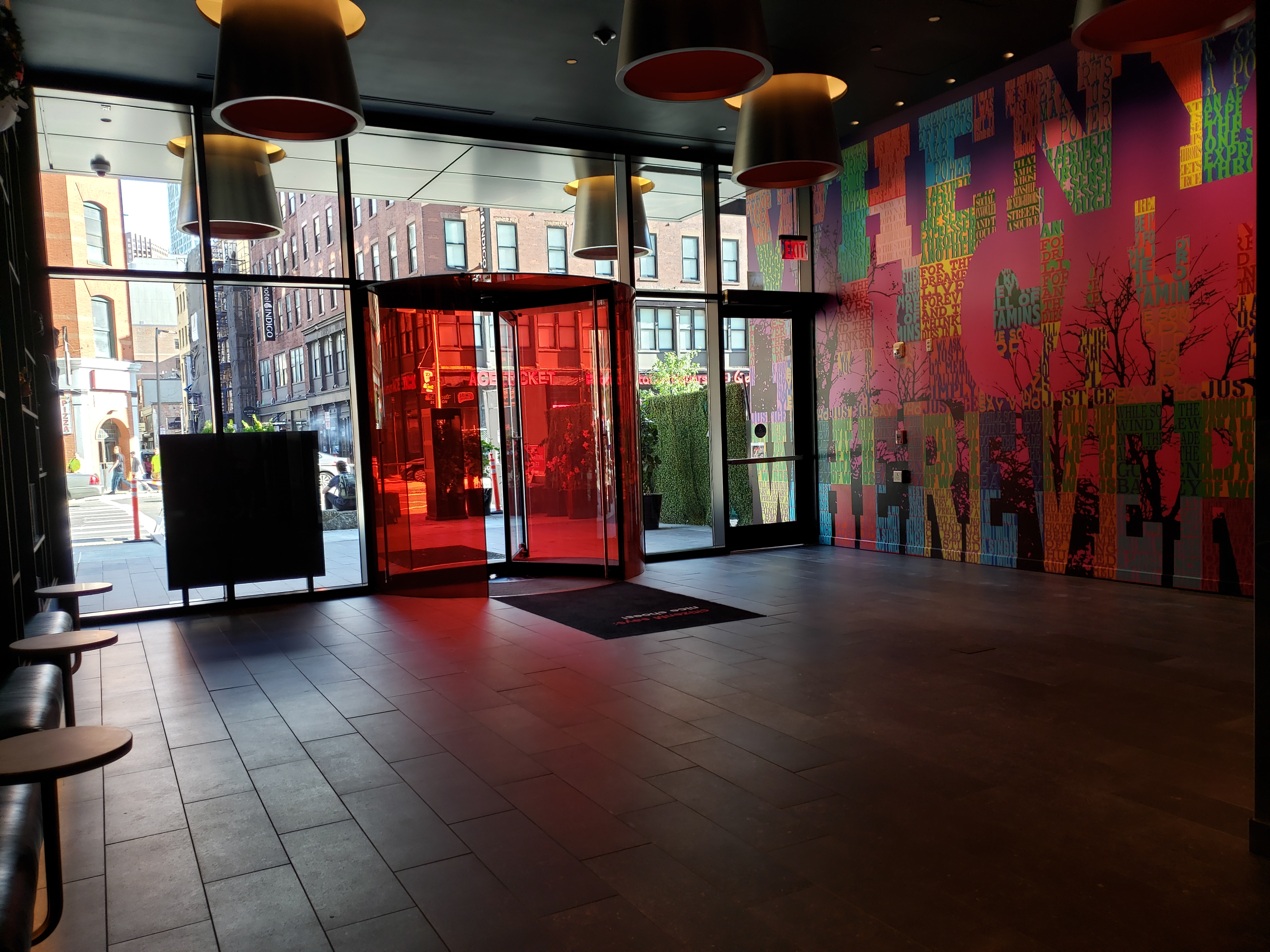
Street-level lobby

The 10-story, 272-room hotel opened in TD Garden's The Hub on Causeway on August 5, 2019, and has a 9,600-square-foot common area. It was designed by Concrete Architectural Associates, Gensler; Moriarty served as the contractor. The interior features artwork by local artists There is no concierge desk, and guests use kiosks for self-checkin. The hotel was CitizenM's third in the United States. It has been described as a "micro" hotel, with "pod-like" rooms.

== Reception ==
The Daily Telegraph's travel writer Linda Laban gave CitizenM a rating of 8 out of 10 and wrote, "Inside and out, the Boston outpost of the Amsterdam-bred citizenM brand is a striking addition to the city's old West End. It is positioned amidst a vibrant development that has extended the city's biggest arena into a multi-faceted dining and nightlife centre, with public transport right on the doorstep."
