= Vince Steckler =

American businessman (1958–2021)

- Born: 18 October 1958; Los Angeles, California, US
- Died: 14 June 2021 (aged 62); Irvine, California, US
- Education: University of California, Irvine
- Occupation: Businessman
- Title: Former CEO of Avast
- Term: 2009–2019
- Successor: Ondřej Vlček
- Children: 5

Vincent Steckler (18 October 1958 – 15 June 2021) was an American businessman and CEO of Avast Software.

== Early life ==
Steckler was born in Los Angeles, but moved to Garden Grove, Orange County at the age of two. He earned two bachelor's degrees—one in mathematics and the other in information and computer science from the University of California, Irvine. After graduating, he worked as a programmer, developing nuclear weapons software for the United States.

== Career ==
Steckler was investigated by the US Securities and Exchange Commission for six years in an "accounting scandal", which he eventually settled for $35,000. When working for Logicon he was responsible for a $7 million order with Legato Systems "that was cancelled yet found its way onto the books".

Steckler joined Symantec in 2000, rising to vice president of Japan and Asia Pacific.

Steckler was appointed CEO of Avast in 2009. He has been credited for the rise in the company's growth, bringing its revenue from 20 to 800 million dollars. Under his leadership, Avast went public in the London Stock Exchange in 2018.

In 2018, he was given the Best CEO in the Cybersecurity Industry award by the European CEO Awards. He retired on 30 June 2019, citing the need for a "better work-life balance" and was succeeded as CEO by Ondřej Vlček, Avast's consumer business president. In May 2021, he joined the board of Nord Security, the company that develops NordVPN.

After retirement, Steckler was active in philanthropy, donating over $10 million to UC Irvine. He was a financial backer of the Magical Bridge organization, a charity that constructs socially inclusive playgrounds.

== Personal life ==
Steckler was married with five children. His wife, Amanda was born in Singapore, and they met there.

== Death ==
On June 15, 2021, Steckler was driving in Irvine when he was fatally struck by another car.
