= Rapid7, Inc. =

- Type: Public
- Traded as: Nasdaq: RPD
- ISIN: US7534221046
- Industry: Cybersecurity
- Incorporated: Boston, Massachusetts
- Founded: July 2000; 26 years ago in Boston, Massachusetts, U.S.
- Founder: Alan Matthews; Tas Giakouminakis; Chad Loder
- Headquarters: 120 Causeway Street, Boston, Massachusetts, United States
- Area served: Worldwide
- Key people: Wael Mohamed (CEO); Corey Thomas (executive chairman)
- Revenue: ▲US$859.8 million (2025)
- Operating income: ▲US$11.6 million (2025)
- Net income: ▲US$23.4 million (2025)
- Total assets: ▲US$1.73 billion (2025)
- Total equity: ▲US$154.7 million (2025)
- Number of employees: 2,613 (2025)
- Website: rapid7.com

Rapid7, Inc. is an American cybersecurity software company headquartered in Boston, Massachusetts.

== History ==
Rapid7 was founded in July 2000 in Boston, Massachusetts by Alan Matthews, Tas Giakouminakis, and Chad Loder to develop vulnerability assessment and network security software. Its first software was a vulnerability scanner NeXpose. In September 2008, Rapid7 received its first institutional funding, a $7 million investment from Bain Capital Ventures, and appointed former Microsoft executive Mike Tuchen as president and chief operating officer. In October 2009, Rapid7 acquired the open-source penetration testing framework Metasploit from researcher H. D. Moore for an undisclosed amount.

In November 2011, Rapid7 raised $50 million in a Series C funding round led by Technology Crossover Ventures. In October 2012, Rapid7 acquired mobile device security firm Mobilisafe. In December 2014, Bain Capital Ventures and TCV invested an additional $30 million in the company.

Rapid7 became a public company on July 17, 2015, listing on the Nasdaq and raised $103 million in net proceeds. In May 2015, the company acquired application security firm NTObjectives. In October 2015, Rapid7 acquired Irish log management firm Logentries for approximately $68 million in cash and stock.

In November 2017, Rapid7 announced plans to consolidate its Boston and Cambridge offices into a new 147,000-square-foot global headquarters at The Hub on Causeway, adjacent to TD Garden. The move was completed in 2019. In April 2019, the company acquired Irish network monitoring company NetFort. In April 2020, Rapid7 acquired cloud security posture management firm DivvyCloud for $145 million.

In February 2021, Rapid7 acquired Kubernetes security firm Alcide.io for $50 million. In April 2021, it acquired the open-source digital forensics and incident response project Velociraptor. In July 2021, Rapid7 acquired Israeli threat intelligence firm IntSights Cyber Intelligence for $335 million in cash and stock.

In April 2022, Rapid7 established a cybersecurity foundation. In March 2023, Rapid7 acquired Israeli anti-ransomware firm Minerva Labs for $38 million in cash and stock. In August 2023, Rapid7 laid off about 18 percent of its workforce, or more than 470 employees.

In July 2024, Rapid7 acquired cyber asset attack surface management firm Noetic Cyber for approximately $51.2 million. Around the same time, Jana Partners disclosed a stake in Rapid7 and urged the board to pursue a sale. The activist investor later increased its economic interest to about 13 percent and worked with Cannae Holdings to push for governance changes. In 2025, Rapid7 reached a settlement with Jana Partners that added three directors to its board, including former Forescout CEO Wael Mohamed.

In March 2026, Rapid7 acquired San Francisco-based agentic AI security platform Kenzo Security. On June 1, 2026, Wael Mohamed was appointed chief executive officer, succeeding Corey Thomas. Thomas became executive chairman of the board.
