= Avast Antivirus =

Antivirus computer program

- Avast Free Antivirus running on Windows 11
- Developer: Gen Digital Inc.
- Stable release: 25.7.10308 / 22 July 2025; 15 months ago (Windows version)
- Operating system: Microsoft Windows, macOS, Android, iOS
- Available in: 45 languages
- Type: Security software, Antivirus software
- License: Freeware, proprietary software
- Website: avast.com

Avast Antivirus is a platform of cross-platform internet security applications developed by Avast, a subsidiary of Gen Digital Inc.. It is available on multiple systems, including Microsoft Windows, macOS, Android, and iOS. Avast offers free and paid products for computer security, browser security, antivirus software, firewall, anti-phishing, antispyware, and anti-spam, among other services.

As of May 2026, the Avast One app is the platform through which individual services are offered on a freeware, à la carte or subscription basis. Within Avast One, many different services can be enabled, such as Avast Free Antivirus. Avast Free Antivirus is the base product in the Avast lineup. It provides important security features such as malware protection, phishing protection, data leak tracking and Wi-Fi security scanning. The free version is available without a credit card or a time limit. Other available services through the application include system cleanup, a secure browser, data breach protection, and more, all managed from one consolidated dashboard.

== History ==
The software that became known as Avast Antivirus was launched in 1988. It was one of the first antivirus programs to ever stop a circulating computer virus when, in 1988, it was the first widely-available antivirus program to successfully detect and remove the “Vienna” virus from an infected disk.

In 2001, Avast Antivirus was the first consumer antivirus software to be offered as a freeware edition. It did so to differentiate itself against commercial software that required expensive up-front purchases or subscriptions. By 2013, the freeware model allowed the company to grow to over 200 million users in 43 languages.

Avast initially launched an freeware enterprise version, Avast for Business, in February 2015. It included antivirus protection, web threat scanning, browser protection, and a cloud management console. This product is now branded as Avast Premium Business Security, as part of the company's cybersecurity solutions product line.

The Avast product lineup was previously sold in subscription tiers. In 2021, Avast launched the Avast One app, a platform consolidating features such as antivirus, anti-malware, anti-tracking, and others into one application. The app offered Basic, Silver, Gold, and Avast One Platinum subscriptions with varying services at each tier.

In 2026, Avast relaunched the Avast One app to offer simplified, à la carte pricing for key services and one dashboard to activate new services. The free version of Avast One offers antivirus, anti-malware, and WiFi vulnerability detection. Additional features, such as VPN, may be added through the app. Bundled packages are still sold: Avast Premium Security also includes advanced features such as real-time ransomware protection, webcam protection, and remote access protection. Avast Ultimate combines Avast Premium Security with additional services such as Avast Cleanup, Avast SecureLine VPN and Avast AntiTrack.

== Platform support ==
In July 2018 and again in September 2018 Avast Software s.r.o announced that after December 2018 new Avast and AVG products would not be made available to users of Windows XP or Windows Vista; users of these operating systems would not transition to the then-upcoming Avast 19.1 scheduled for release in early 2019, but would instead remain on Avast 18.8 scheduled for release in November 2018; virus definition updates would still be provided for Windows XP and Windows Vista, and these operating systems would still be supported going forward. Avast Software s.r.o also provided a set of download links for offline and online installation files for users of these operating systems. Gen Digital announced in October 2024, however, that it would no longer test virus definition update releases on Windows XP.

== Reception ==
The Avast One application relaunch in 2026 was received well by critics. Gizmodo described it as "free protection that is actually good, with paid add-ons that are genuinely optional." PCMag called it "a clear Editors' Choice winner for free antivirus software" for "Android, iOS, macOS, and Windows devices." TechRadar noted that "the free tier starts with industry leading antivirus protection, scam protection, and web protection" and "users only pay for what they need" beyond that. Tom's Guide described it as "fantastic" and "a great choice" that "offers robust protection against deepfakes, sophisticated malware, and more," although it criticized the lack of a web backup.

As of January 2015, Avast had the largest share of the market for antivirus applications. In 2016, Avast had more than 400 million users and 40% of the global antivirus market excluding China. Parent company Gen Digital employs approximately 4,000 employees worldwide. In September 2016, Avast purchased AVG Technologies, another antivirus company, for US$1.3 billion. In 2022, Avast merged with NortonLifelock to form Gen Digital.

== Controversies ==
In January 2020, multiple news sources reported that Jumpshot, a subsidiary of Avast at the time, was selling the browsing history of Avast Free product users. Though Avast claimed all data was de-identified, it was reported that the sold data could in some instances be linked back to users' real identities. In response, Avast announced that it would close the subsidiary over the data privacy backlash. In February 2024, the Federal Trade Commission fined Avast $16.5 million for collecting user data and the FTC sent settlement notices to Avast customers by email in February 2025.

== See also ==
- Avast One
- Avast Secure Browser
- Avast SecureLine VPN
