= Graphene Flagship =

European Union scientific research initiative

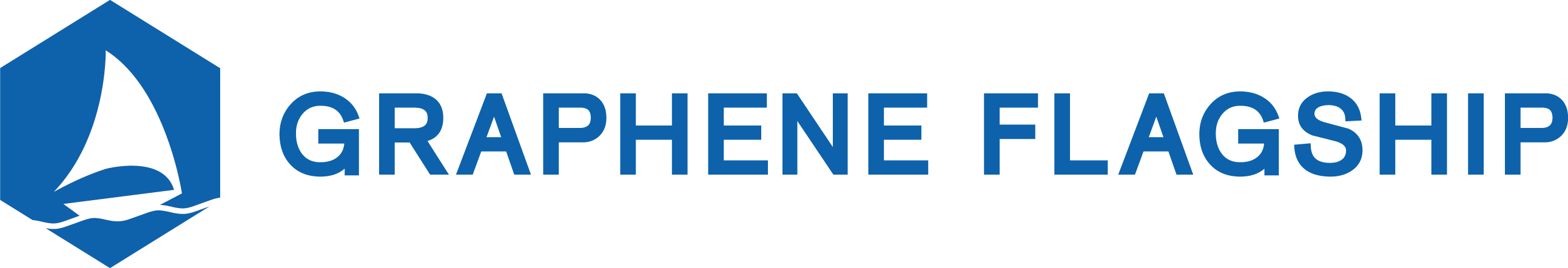
- Type of project: Scientific Research
- Location: Europe
- Owner: European Union
- Established: 2013
- Funding: Horizon 2020
- Website: graphene-flagship.eu

The Graphene Flagship is a European Union scientific research initiative. With a budget of €1 billion, it is one of the large scale initiatives organized by the Future and Emerging Technologies program, along with the Human Brain Project and the Quantum Technologies Flagship. Through a combined academic-industrial consortium, the research effort attempts to develop technologies which range from basic research to production and system integration, using the unique properties of graphene. There are some critics of this and similar initiatives, arguing that the funding of graphene-related research and innovation is disproportional to estimates of industrial potential. However, advocates for the Graphene Flagship note the merits of the initiative’s wide-ranging, applications-focused research, and the potential for graphene to catalyze innovation and economic growth across sectors and interest areas including biomedical research and health, transport, water safety, energy efficiency, battery and semiconductor development, wearable electronics, digital communications, sustainability and the environment, and space exploration.

== History ==
In 2009, the European Commission identified the need for Europe to address the big scientific and technological challenges of the age through long-term, multidisciplinary R&D efforts. One of the first European Future and Emerging Technologies (FET) Flagships, the Graphene Flagship was founded in October 2013. It was initially implemented as a Seventh Framework Programme under the European Commission's Directorate General for Communications Networks, Content and Technology (DG Connect). The consortium now falls under FP7's successor research and innovation framework, Horizon 2020.

== Organisation ==
The Graphene Flagship is coordinated by Chalmers University of Technology, based in Gothenburg, Sweden. The director of the project is Jari Kinaret, leader of the Condensed Matter Theory group at Chalmers’ Department of Applied Physics; vice-director is Patrik Johansson, research professor at Chalmers University of Technology. The operative management is handled by the Director and a Management Panel chaired by the Science and Technology Officer, Andrea C. Ferrari from the University of Cambridge, and includes the Flagship Director, the Head of Innovation and the five Division Heads. Strategic decisions are taken by the executive board which includes the members of the management panel and ten members elected by the General Assembly of all 150 partners.

The Strategic Advisory Council (SAC) consists of scientific and industrial experts, including three Nobel laureates. Its role is to advise on strategic research decisions and issues pertaining to handling and protection of intellectual property whilst also facilitating contacts to related national and international research programs and acting as ambassadors for the Graphene Flagship. The Chairman of the Strategic Advisory Council is Andre Geim, University of Manchester, Manchester, UK. The Graphene Flagship is divided into 19 work packages, 15 focusing on specific science and technology topics, and four dedicated to innovation and operational/management functions. The work packages are grouped into six divisions to enhance collaboration and communication. One of the Divisions is housing the partnering projects. The project invests one third of its funding into 11 Spearhead Projects, aimed to increase the Technology Readiness Level (TRL) of graphene-based technologies.

== Funding ==
The Graphene Flagship is divided into two separate phases: a 30-month ramp-up phase under the 7th Framework Program (October 1, 2013 – March 31, 2016) with a total European Commission funding of €54 million, and a steady state phase under the Horizon 2020 Program with expected European Commission funding of €50 million per year. During the FP7 phase the flagship was implemented as a combination of two instruments, a Collaborative Project, Coordination and Support Action (CP-CSA), and a European Research Area Network Plus (ERANET+), while in H2020 the flagship is being implemented as a single instrument. In FP7, the CP-CSA was funded by the EC according to standard FP7 financing schemes, and the ERANET+ was funded jointly by the EC and the member state funding organisations. In H2020, the single instrument is being funded jointly by the EC and the member states.

== Impact ==
Over the past 9 years, the Graphene Flagship has successfully brought graphene out of the lab, creating a fruitful European industrial ecosystem that develops applications using graphene and layered materials. In the beginning, project partners were mostly academic. However, the Graphene Flagship now includes over 100 companies working together with the Graphene Flagship’s academic partners in fields ranging from the automotive and aviation industries to electronics, energy, composites and biomedicine. The proportion of companies has grown from just 15 at the launch of the Graphene Flagship to roughly 50% of the consortium today. In its efforts to further shift the focus to industrial applications, the Graphene Flagship has launched the 2D Experimental Pilot Line which is the first foundry (factory to process graphene into shapes) to integrate graphene and related layered materials into semiconductor platforms.

The Graphene Flagship has proven to promote, support and deliver on excellent science. In their 2021 Annual Report, they reported that at time of publication, 5,000 scientific research studies had been published with approximately 200,000 citations, and 302 patent applications had been granted.

In terms of applications, researchers have demonstrated graphene’s potential across a wide range of areas. As well as being the thinnest, strongest, and lightest known material, graphene is flexible, impermeable to molecules and extremely electrically and thermally conductive. This means that among its applications, it is being used to develop next-generation optoelectronics and optical communications systems; to drive advances in solar cells, batteries, super capacitors, hydrogen storage and fuel cells, and sustainable city development; to pave the way for biomedical products including targeted drug delivery and biosensors; and to improve the mechanics of aircraft, aeronautics, and human space exploration.
