= Angelo Vistoli =

Italian mathematician

- Born: 1 June 1958 (age 67); Massa Lombarda
- Scientific career
- Institutions: Scuola Normale Superiore di Pisa
- Thesis: Duality in the Intersection Theory of Moduli Spaces (1987)

Angelo Vistoli (born 1 June 1958, Massa Lombarda) is an Italian mathematician working on algebraic geometry.

== Career ==
Vistoli earned a laurea (the Italian equivalent of a master's degree) in 1981 at the University of Bologna. He became a student of Michael Artin at the Massachusetts Institute of Technology, where he completed his Ph.D. in 1987 with the dissertation Duality in the Intersection Theory of Moduli Spaces.

After becoming Benjamin Pierce Lecturer and assistant professor in mathematics at Harvard University, he returned to Italy as a professor at the University of Basilicata in 1990. He moved to the University of Bologna in 1993, and to the Scuola Normale Superiore di Pisa in 2006, where he is professor of geometry.

In 2024, he succeeded Andrea Ferrara as president of the Classe di Scienze (Faculty of Science) of the Scuola Normale Superiore.
