= AVG PC TuneUp =

Utility software suite for Microsoft Windows

- TuneUp Utilities 2014
- Original author: TuneUp Utilities
- Developer: AVG Technologies / Avast
- Initial release: 1997; 28 years ago
- Stable release: 2018.2 (build 192) / October 2018
- Operating system: Windows XP, Windows Vista, Windows 7, Windows 8, Windows 10
- Platform: x86 and x64
- Size: 45.0 MB
- Available in: English, German, French, Spanish, Dutch, Italian, Portuguese, Polish, Japanese, Russian, Czech, Indonesian, Turkish, Chinese.
- Type: Utility software
- License: Trialware
- Website: avg.com/avg-pctuneup

AVG TuneUp, previously called AVG PC Tuneup, and TuneUp Utilities, is a utility software suite for Microsoft Windows and Macintosh computers, designed to help manage, maintain, optimize, configure, and troubleshoot a computer system. It was produced and developed by TuneUp Software GmbH. TuneUp Software was headquartered in Darmstadt, Germany, and co-founded by Tibor Schiemann and Christoph Laumann in 1997. In 2011, AVG Technologies acquired TuneUp Software. AVG was then acquired by Avast in 2016 and became part of Gen Digital in 2022.

As of 2025, at least 24 major versions of TuneUp Utilities have been released. TuneUp Utilities has attained generally positive reviews, although multiple reviewers did not approve of its price for value.

== Features ==
AVG TuneUp has features for computer (PC and Mac) maintenance, optimization, updates, to free up hard-drive space, and to uninstall unwanted applications. The "Automatic Maintenance" tool removes tracking cookies, cache files, old files from removed applications, and fixes issues with the Windows registry. TuneUp's "Sleep Mode" puts background processes to sleep until needed to reduce their burden on the computer's resources. TuneUp also has an uninstaller to remove unwanted programs like bloatware and a software updater that installs the most recent patches or updates. The Disk Cleaner and Browser Cleaner tools remove installer files, temporary system files, browser caches, and other files.

== Development ==
Supported operating systems
Operating system	Earliest version	Latest version
Windows 95	97	2003
Windows 98	97	2007
Windows Me	2003	2007
Windows 2000	2003	2008
Windows XP with Service Pack 1 or earlier^{A}	2003	2008
Windows XP with Service Pack 2 or later^{A}	2003/2009	2014
Windows XP Professional x64 Edition	2006	2014
Windows Vista	2007	2014
Windows 7	2010	2020
Windows 8	2013	2021
Windows 10	2015	2021

The first version of the software, TuneUp 97, was released in 1997. New versions have been released over the years ever since.

TuneUp Utilities 2003
The first version is available in English, French, and German. It consists of 16 individual tools accessible through the Start Center, as well as the Windows start Menu. It includes features to clean the hard disks, clean and defragment the Windows Registry, optimize Windows and Internet connection settings and change the look and feel of Windows. It also provides features targeted at users with an intermediate or advanced level of computer knowledge that enables them to edit the registry, manage running processes, uninstall programs, shred and undelete files, and display system information. In addition to the previously-supported Windows 95 and Windows 98, TuneUp Utilities 2003 also supports Windows 2000, Me and Windows XP.

TuneUp Utilities 2004
The 2004 release introduced TuneUp 1-Click Maintenance and TuneUp WinStyler (the predecessor TuneUp Styler). It also includes registry defragmentation support for Windows 2000 and XP.

TuneUp Utilities 2006
In TuneUp Utilities 2006, optimization, customization, and disk cleaning tools that support Mozilla Firefox were added. A feature was added where the TuneUp StartUp Manager displays editorial rating and explanations about well-known programs that start during computer startup. TuneUp Styler, in this version, is able to change the boot logo of Windows XP.

TuneUp Utilities 2007
TuneUp Utilities 2007 featured two new components: TuneUp Disk Doctor and TuneUp Disk Space Explorer. TuneUp Utilities 2007 also supports Windows Vista.

TuneUp Utilities 2008
The 2008 version incorporated two more components: TuneUp Drive Defrag and TuneUp Repair Wizard.

TuneUp Utilities 2009
In the 2009 version, Start Center added a new section that analyzes the system and then displays the current status as well as available recommendations (if any) in three areas: System maintenance, Speed and System status. This version introduced TuneUp Speed Optimizer (renamed StartUp Optimizer in subsequent versions) and TuneUp Shortcut Cleaner. The TuneUp Styler added in this version can change the Windows Vista logo animation displayed during startup.

TuneUp Utilities 2010
TuneUp Utilities 2010 added compatibility with Windows 7. A new Turbo Mode introduced in this version allows the user to disable multiple background functions of Windows and programs with one click, like Windows Aero, Windows Search, Windows Error Reporting or synchronization with mobile devices. This version also introduced TuneUp Live Optimization.

TuneUp Utilities 2011
In 2011 TuneUp Program Deactivator was added. Deactivator can disable programs that impose significant system load, thereby eliminating the load without uninstalling the programs. If the user tries to start a disabled program again, TuneUp Program Deactivator automatically re-enables the program on the fly. A new program rating functionality in this version shows how other TuneUp Utilities users have rated the usefulness of a given program on a scale of 1 to 5 stars. The Start Center also includes a Tuning Status, which tracks and displays optimization progress and highlights areas with remaining optimization potential.

TuneUp Utilities 2012
The 2012 version introduced a new Economy Mode that, when enabled, helps save battery power.

TuneUp Utilities 2013
In 2013, the software was improved in the area of disk cleanup and performance optimization via the Program Deactivator and the Live Optimization. Windows 8 support was added.

TuneUp Utilities 2014
The 2014 version of TuneUp Utilities introduced the Duplicate Finder, Windows 8.1 App Cleaner, and Flight Mode. The User Interface, Disc Cleaner and Automatic Cleaning Updates were also improved.

AVG PC TuneUp 2015
With the 2015 version, TuneUp Utilities was merged with the almost identical AVG PC TuneUp.

AVG PC TuneUp 2017
The 2017 version improved the licensing, so the software could be installed on an unlimited number of computers in the same household. It also introduced an automatic software updater that checks for newer versions of software installed on the computer.

AVG PC TuneUp 2018
The 2018 version added an improved user interface and new uninstaller tools.

AVG PC TuneUp 2019
The 2019 version added new statistics and a Disk Doctor feature to scan and fix hard drive errors on users PCs.:

AVG TuneUp 2020-2025

Annual releases thereafter have added incremental improvements, including support for Mac computers.

== Critical reception ==
TuneUp Utilities received generally positive reviews.

Computer Shopper magazine reviewed TuneUp Utilities 2009 and gave it a score of 8 out of 10. It commended TuneUp Registry Cleaner as well as the hard-drive-related components of the product. However, it also noted that some tools are superficially implemented. The software lacks an antivirus and personal firewall. TuneUp Utilities 2009 was voted No. 37 of "The Top 100 Products of 2009" by Computer Shopper readers and was named "Best Utility Suite" by the editors.

CNET reviewed TuneUp Utilities 2009 and gave it 5 stars out of 5. "To call TuneUp Utilities 2009 useful would drastically understate the situation", said Seth Rosenblatt, an associate editor with CNET. He said TuneUp Utilities was a powerful and easy-to-use set of tools, with its disk cleanup and registry cleaner being the "bread-and-butter" of the suite.

PC World's Preston Gralla reviewed the 2010 version and commented that TuneUp Utilities is a comprehensive suite that "includes everything from a startup optimizer to a defragmenter, from an overall speed optimizer to a Windows Registry cleaner, and more". However, he said that the high price of the entire suite ($50) might make a purchase decision more difficult. Preston had also previously reviewed TuneUp Utilities 2009 for PC Advisor and gave it 4.5 stars out of 5 stars.

PC Magazine reviewed TuneUp Utilities 2011 and gave it a score of 4 out of 5. "Overall, the software does a fine job of revitalizing a worn PC," commented Jeffrey L. Wilson, a PC Magazine software analyst. He appreciated the product's one-click repair feature and the subsequent reduction in his test PC's boot-time. However, Wilson criticized the software license that only permits installation on up to three PCs. In comparison, a competing product called Iolo System Mechanic 10, allows an unlimited number of installations in the same household.

TuneUp Utilities received a Softpedia Pick award from Softpedia. Although Softpedia editor Alex Muradin expressed concern about the lack of proper technical support for TuneUp Utilities 2006, he gave the product a final score of 5 out of 5. However, he gave this product a subscore of 3 out of 5 for pricing/value.

Author Christian Immler characterizes TuneUp Utilities as a classic amongst tuning tools. CNET reviewed TuneUp Utilities 2015 and gave it a score of 3.5 out of 5. "AVG PC TuneUp is a well-designed and effective tool that mostly accomplishes what it claims. Its advantage lies in its streamlined user flow and one-click-friendly design," said Eddie Cho, a tech editor and producer for CNET.

== Notes ==
1. Only Windows XP Home Edition, Professional Edition and Media Center Edition are supported.
