= IMedix =

iMedix
- Company type: Private
- Website type: Health information
- Founded: 2006
- Headquarters: New York City, United States
- Key people: Amir Leitersdorf, Co-Founder and Chief Executive Officer; Iri Amirav, CMO and Co-Founder
- Website: iMedix.com
- Launched: January, 2006
- Current status: Active

iMedix is a health information website that describes itself as an "Independent Drug & Health Platform" providing information on medicines and health. It was founded in 2006 by Amir Leitersdorf and Iri Amirav in the United States, with its R&D based in Herzeliya, Israel, and originally operated as a health search engine and social network service using proprietary algorithms to provide information in response to medical questions.

On May 18, 2011, AVG Technologies acquired iMedix Web Technologies Ltd., aiming for "the integration of iMedix software with the Company’s existing solutions." After shutting down sometime after February 2012, the website was reactivated in 2014 and has been operational since then.

== Service and technology ==
iMedix initially combined a health search engine with a collaborative community platform. According to its User Content Policy, in August 2026 iMedix permanently discontinued public comments, community questions and answers, and public health-content submissions on its English, German and French editions, and removed previously published user submissions and the associated public community member accounts. iMedix states that its medical content is attributed to identifiable authors, reviewed by licensed healthcare professionals, and supported by cited sources.

== Reception ==
iMedix was recognized as one of PCWorld's 100 Incredibly Useful and Interesting Web Sites in 2008.
