= Avast =

Czech security software company

Avast Software s.r.o.
- Logo used since 2021

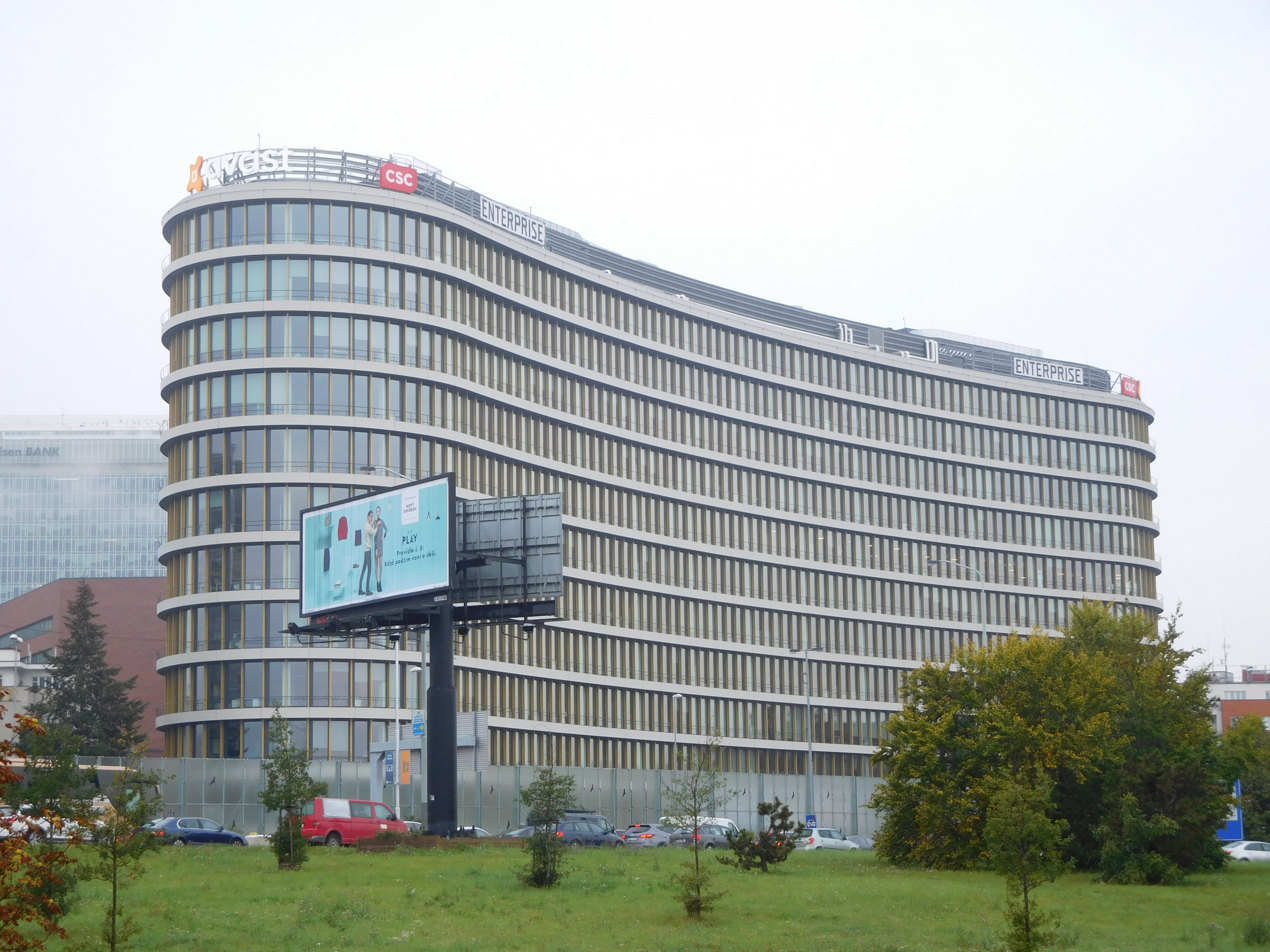
- Enterprise Office Center building, Gen Digital co-headquarters in Prague
- Formerly: Alwil Software
- Type: Subsidiary
- Traded as: LSE: AVST (until 2022); PSE: AVST (until 2022)
- Industry: Computer software
- Founded: 1988; 38 years ago
- Founders: Pavel Baudiš; Eduard Kučera
- Headquarters: Prague, Czech Republic
- Area served: Worldwide
- Key people: John G. Schwarz (Chairperson); Ondřej Vlček (CEO)
- Products: Cybersecurity software
- Services: Computer security
- Revenue: ▲US$892.9 million (2020)
- Operating income: ▼US$335.4 million (2020)
- Net income: ▼US$169.6 million (2020)
- Total assets: ▼US$2.707 billion (2020)
- Total equity: ▲US$1.195 billion (2020)
- Number of employees: (2025)
- Parent: Gen Digital
- Subsidiaries: AVG Technologies; Piriform Software; HMA
- Website: www.avast.com

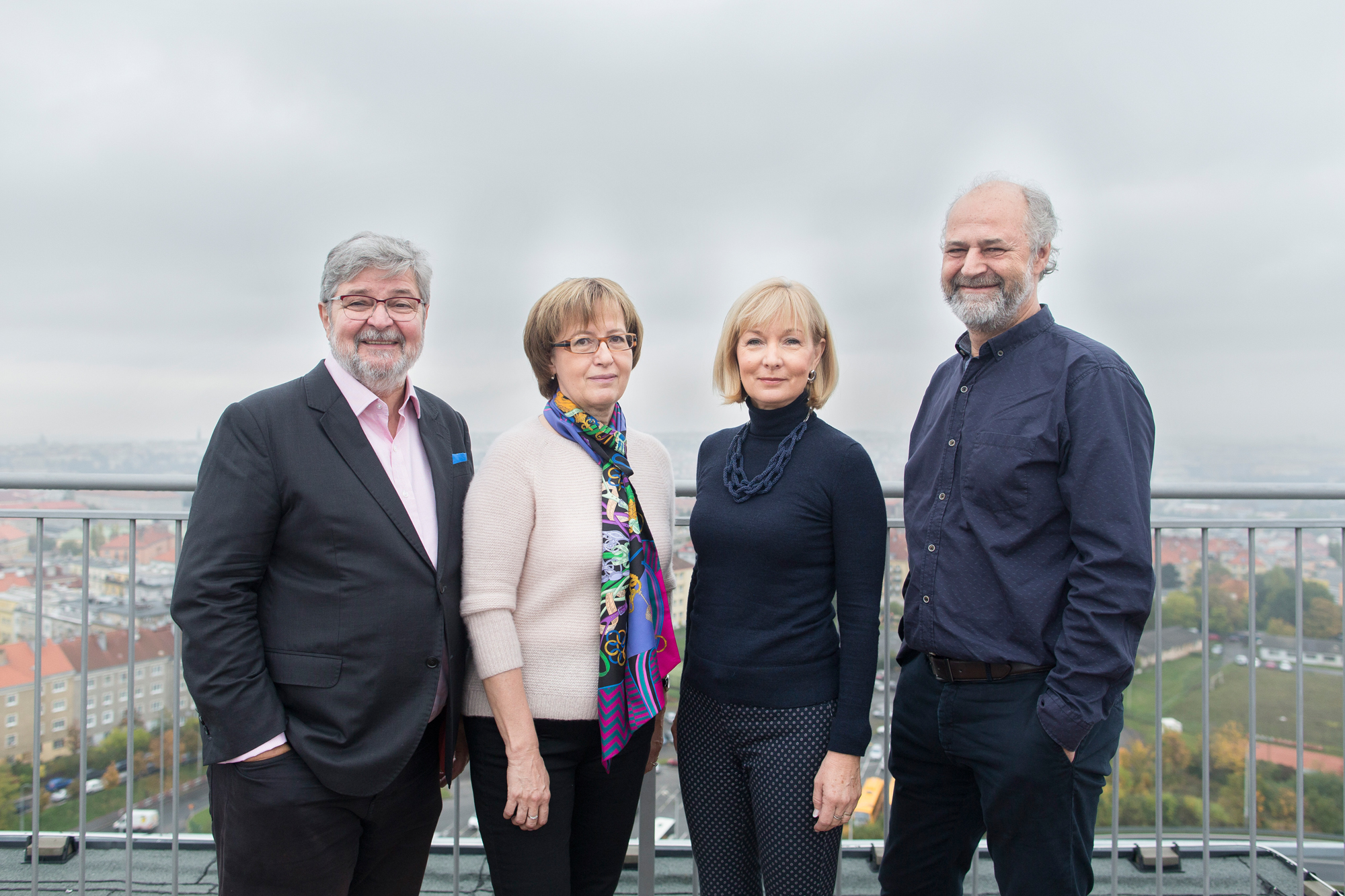
Avast founders Eduard Kučera (left) and Pavel Baudiš (right) in 2016 with their spouses, who run the non-profit Avast Foundation for community development

Avast Software s.r.o. is a subsidiary of Gen Digital. It is a Czech multinational cybersecurity software company headquartered in Prague, Czech Republic, that researches and develops computer security software, machine learning, and artificial intelligence. Avast had more than 435 million monthly active users and the second largest market share among anti-malware application vendors worldwide as of April 2020. As of 2025, parent company Gen Digital had approximately 4,000 employees worldwide.

Avast was founded by Pavel Baudiš and Eduard Kučera in 1988 as a cooperative, initially known as Alwil Software. It later rebranded to Avast, and in July 2016, acquired competitor AVG Technologies. At the time, AVG was the third-ranked antivirus product. It was dual-listed on the Prague Stock Exchange and on the London Stock Exchange and was a constituent of the FTSE 100 Index until it was acquired by NortonLifeLock in September 2022.

In July 2021, NortonLifeLock, an American cybersecurity company, announced that it was in talks to merge with Avast Software. In August 2021, Avast's board of directors agreed to an offer of US$8 billion. After the merger was completed in September 2022, the combined company became known as Gen Digital.

The company's main platform is Avast One, through which users can access products like Avast Antivirus, and tools such as the Avast Secure Browser and the Avast SecureLine VPN.

Avast produces Avast Online Security, which is its main extension, but it also has extensions like Avast SafePrice and Avast Passwords.

== History ==
Avast was founded by Eduard Kučera and Pavel Baudiš in 1988. The founders met each other at the Research Institute for Mathematical Machines in Czechoslovakia. They studied math and computer science, because the Communist Party of Czechoslovakia would require them to join the communist party to study physics. At the institute, Pavel Baudiš discovered the Vienna virus on a floppy disk and developed the first program to remove it. Afterwards, he asked Eduard Kučera to join him in cofounding Avast as a cooperative. The cooperative was originally called Alwil Software and only the software was named Avast.

The cooperative was changed to a joint partnership in 1991, two years after the velvet revolution caused a regime change in Czechoslovakia. The new regime severed ties with the Soviet Union and reverted the country's economic system to a market economy. In 1995, Avast employee Ondřej Vlček wrote the first antivirus program for the Windows 95 operating system. In the 1990s, security researchers at the Virus Bulletin, an IT security testing organization, gave the Avast software an award in every category tested, increasing the popularity of the software. However, by the late 1990s, the company was struggling financially. Alwil Software rebuffed acquisition offers by McAfee, who was licensing the Avast antivirus engine.

By 2001, Alwil Software was experiencing financial difficulties, when it converted to a freemium model, offering a base Avast software product at no cost. As a result of the freemium model, the number of users of the software grew to one million by 2004 and 20 million by 2006. Former Symantec executive Vince Steckler was appointed CEO of Avast in 2009. In 2010, Alwil Software changed its name to Avast, adopting the name of the software, and raised $100 million in venture capital investments. The following December, Avast filed for an initial public offering, but withdrew its application the following July, citing changes in market conditions. In 2012, Avast fired its outsourced tech support service iYogi, after it was discovered that iYogi was using misleading sales tactics to persuade customers to buy unnecessary services. By 2013, Avast had 200 million users in 38 countries and had been translated into 43 languages. At the time, the company had 350 employees.

In 2014, CVC Capital bought an interest in Avast for an undisclosed sum. The purchase valued Avast at $1 billion. Later that year, Avast acquired mobile app developer Inmite in order to build Avast's mobile apps. Additionally, Avast's online support forum was compromised in 2014, exposing 400,000 names, passwords and email addresses. By 2015, Avast had the largest share of the market for antivirus software. In July 2016, Avast reached an agreement to buy AVG for $1.3 billion. AVG was a large IT security company that sold software for desktops and mobile devices. In July 2017, Avast acquired UK-based Piriform for an undisclosed sum. Piriform was the developer of CCleaner. Shortly afterwards it was disclosed that someone may have created a malicious version of CCleaner with a backdoor for hackers. Avast had its IPO on the London Stock Exchange in May 2018, which valued it at £2.4bn and was one of the UK's biggest technology listings.

Ondřej Vlček assumed the role of CEO and co-owner of Avast Plc in July 2019. A day later, he changed his annual pay to $1 and pledged his board director's compensation of $100,000 to charity. In October 2019, Jaya Baloo joined Avast as their Chief Information Security Officer.

In April 2020, Avast released a new secure, private mobile web browser for Android based on technology acquired from previously unreported acquisition of Tenta, a Seattle-based startup.

In July 2021, NortonLifeLock, an American cybersecurity company, announced that it is in talks to merge with Avast Software. In August 2021, Avast's board of directors agreed to an offer of US$8 billion. In September 2022, the Competition and Markets Authority approved the proposed takeover by NortonLifeLock so allowing the transaction to be completed. The merged company became known as Gen Digital.

== Products ==
Avast develops and markets business and consumer IT security products for servers, desktops, and mobile devices. The company sells both the Avast product line and the acquired AVG-branded products. As of late 2017, the company had merged the AVG and Avast business product lines and were working to integrate the corporate departments from both companies. Additionally, Avast has developed utility software products to improve battery life on mobile devices, cleanup unnecessary files on a hard drive, find secure wireless networks or create a VPN connection to the internet.

Avast and AVG consumer security software are sold on a freemium model, where basic security features are free, but more advanced features require purchasing a premium version. Each feature, such as Avast Antivirus, is published through the Avast One platform, which presents a dashboard allowing users to use free features (antivirus, etc.) or select paid features (VPN, data breach protection, etc.) The free version is also supported by ads. Additionally, all Avast users provide data about their PC or mobile device to Avast, which is used to identify new security threats. Antivirus scanning, browser cleanup, a secure browser, password management, and network security features are provided for free, while firewall, anti-spam, and online banking features have to be purchased. About 3% of Avast's users pay for a premium version (10% in the US).

The Avast business product family includes features for endpoint protection, Wi-Fi security, antivirus, identity protection, password management, and data protection. For example, the desktop product will look for vulnerabilities in the wi-fi network and run applications suspect of having malicious software in an isolated sandbox. The Avast Business Managed Workplace monitors and manages desktops, and assesses on-site security protocols. The company also sells management software for IT administrators to deploy and manage Avast installations.

=== Reception ===
In 2021, PC Magazine gave Avast Free Antivirus software an overall score of 4 out of 5 and gave AVG, which was purchased by Avast in 2016, a score of 4, plus "AVG AntiVirus Free offers precisely the same virus protection engine as Avast Free Antivirus, but it lacks the impressive collection of additional features you get with Avast." In tests conducted by the AV-TEST Institute in August 2021, Avast and AVG received six out of six points for protection and usability, and six out of six points for performance. A review in Tom's Guide says that the free Avast antivirus product has "good protection against malware" and takes up little space on the system. The review says that Avast has a competitive set of features for a free antivirus product, but the scans are sometimes not very fast.

The Avast antivirus product for business users received 4 out of 5 by TechRadar in 2017. The review said that the software had good features, protection, configuration and an "excellent interface", but it took up a lot of hard disk space and did not cover mobile devices. According to Tom's Guide, the mobile version is inexpensive and packed with features. PC Magazine said that the mobile version "has almost all the security features you could want."

AVG has also generally performed well in lab tests. A review in Tom's Hardware gave the AVG software seven out of ten stars. The review highlighted that the software has a small system footprint and has good malware protection, but does not have a quick scan option and lacks many additional features.

== Collection and sale of user data ==
In late 2019, Avast browser extensions were found to collect user data, including browsing behavior and history, and send it to a remote server. The discovery led to the extensions of the Avast and AVG brands being temporarily removed from the Google Chrome, Firefox, and Opera extension stores, however, they returned a short time later, as there was no concrete evidence that demonstrated a breach of private data of the users.

In January 2020, a joint investigation by Motherboard and PCMag found that the Avast Antivirus and AVG AntiVirus Free version were collecting user data, which was being resold to personalize advertising through a subsidiary, Jumpshot. The leaked documents showed that Jumpshot offered to provide its customers with "Every search. Every click. On every site." from more than 100 million compromised devices. In response, Avast announced on January 30, 2020, that it would immediately shut down Jumpshot and cease all operations due to the backlash of its users' data privacy.

On the basis of the information revealed, on 11 February 2020 the Czech Office for Personal Data Protection announced that it had initiated a preliminary investigation.

In February 2024, the Federal Trade Commission fined Avast $16.5 million for collecting user data and reselling that data. In February 2025, settlement notices were sent to Avast customers by email.

== See also ==
- Avast Antivirus
- Avast Secure Browser
- Avast SecureLine VPN
