= Kapteyn Astronomical Institute =

Astronomical institute at the University of Groningen

Coordinates: 53.2402°N 6.5341°E

The Kapteyn Astronomical Institute is the department of astronomy of the University of Groningen in the Netherlands.

The institute is named after its founder, Jacobus Cornelius Kapteyn, who lived from 1851 to 1922. Jacobus Kapteyn was appointed professor of astronomy and theoretical mechanics in 1878 at a time when no astronomical tradition, let alone an observatory, existed in Groningen. Kapteyn's first "Astronomical Laboratory" was opened in 1896. In 1913, after various relocations, the laboratory moved to the Broerstraat, near the Academiegebouw in the center of the city. In 1970, the institute relocated to a new building on the campus site to the north of the city. Since 1983, the Kapteyn Astronomical Institute has been located at its present position in the Zernike building, where it shares a building with the Low Energy Astrophysics division of SRON. From 1965 until 1995, an observatory —also named after Kapteyn— (Dutch: Kapteyn Sterrenwacht) was operated near the town of Roden, some 20 km Southwest of Groningen. The buildings still exist, but are no longer in use as an observatory, nor as an astronomical workshop.

The research pursued by the institute's astronomers includes asteroids, planetary formation, stars, galaxies and cosmology.

The Blaauw Professorship is an honorary professorship in the field of Astronomy and Astrophysics awarded by the Institute within the University of Groningen.
