= Andrea Ferrari (sailor) =

Italian sailor

Andrea Ferrari (16 September 1915 – 24 February 2011) was an Italian sailor who competed in the 1952 Summer Olympics.
