= Quantum Flagship =

European Union research initiative

- Type of project: Scientific Research
- Location: Europe
- Owner: European Union
- Established: 2018
- Website: qt.eu

The Quantum Technologies Flagship is a European Union scientific research initiative. With a budget of €1 billion, it is one of the large scale initiatives organized by the Future and Emerging Technologies program, along with the Human Brain Project and the Graphene Flagship.The Quantum Flagship funds over 5,000 European researchers over ten years. Its long-term vision is to develop in Europe a quantum web, where quantum computers, simulators and sensors are interconnected via quantum communication networks. The objective being to develop in Europe a competitive quantum industry making research results available as commercial applications and disruptive technologies.

== Beginning of the flagship ==
In 2016, the European Commissioner for digital economy and society Günther Oettinger invited the quantum community to provide a common European strategy on quantum technologies. Endorsed by 3.400 individuals from academia and industry, a “quantum manifesto” was released in May 2016 in the Netherlands The document called for the European Commission to launch an ambitious European initiative in quantum technologies to ensure Europe's leading role in a technological revolution underway. Following this document, the European Commission appointed a High Level Steering Committee, composed of 12 academic members and 12 industry members, to deliver a strategic research agenda, an implementation model and a governance model for the quantum technologies flagship. The report of this committee was delivered in 2017, giving a long-term vision of a “quantum web” and the flagship was launched in 2018, bringing under the same brand research institutions, industry, and public funders. The quantum technologies flagship with an expected budget of €1 billion from the EU over 10 years aims to support the transformation of European research into commercial applications.

In October 2018, the recipients of the first grants were announced, for a total of €132 million distributed among 20 projects and three years.
