= Andrea Ferrara (jurist) =

Italian jurist

President of the Court of Cassation
- In office 12 November 1947 – 11 November 1952

Personal details
- Born: 11 November 1882 Tursi, Italy
- Died: 1 July 1954 (aged 71) Rome, Italy
- Profession: Jurist

Andrea Ferrara (11 November 1882 - 1 July 1954) was an Italian jurist who served as the first president of the Court of Cassation of the Italian Republic from 12 November 1947 to 11 November 1952.

Ferrara was born in Tursi in 1882 to Luigi Ferrara and Rachele Capitolo. He became a magistrate in 1905 and served as a judge in Matera from 1908 and Taranto from 1914. He was appointed counselor to the Court of Appeals in 1923 and to the Court of Cassation in 1929. From 1936 he served as president of the section of the Court of Cassation.

In 1947, in addition to becoming president of the Court of Cassation, Ferrara was appointed chief of staff of the Ministry of Justice Giuseppe Grassi and head of a committee to reform the Code of Civil Procedure. His scholarly work focused primarily on commercial law.

On 29 November 1952, Ferrara was awarded the Grand Cross of the Order of Merit of the Italian Republic.

Ferrara died in Rome on July. 1st 1954 at the age of 71.
