= The Hub on Causeway =

Multi-skyscraper complex in Boston, US

- The Hub Office
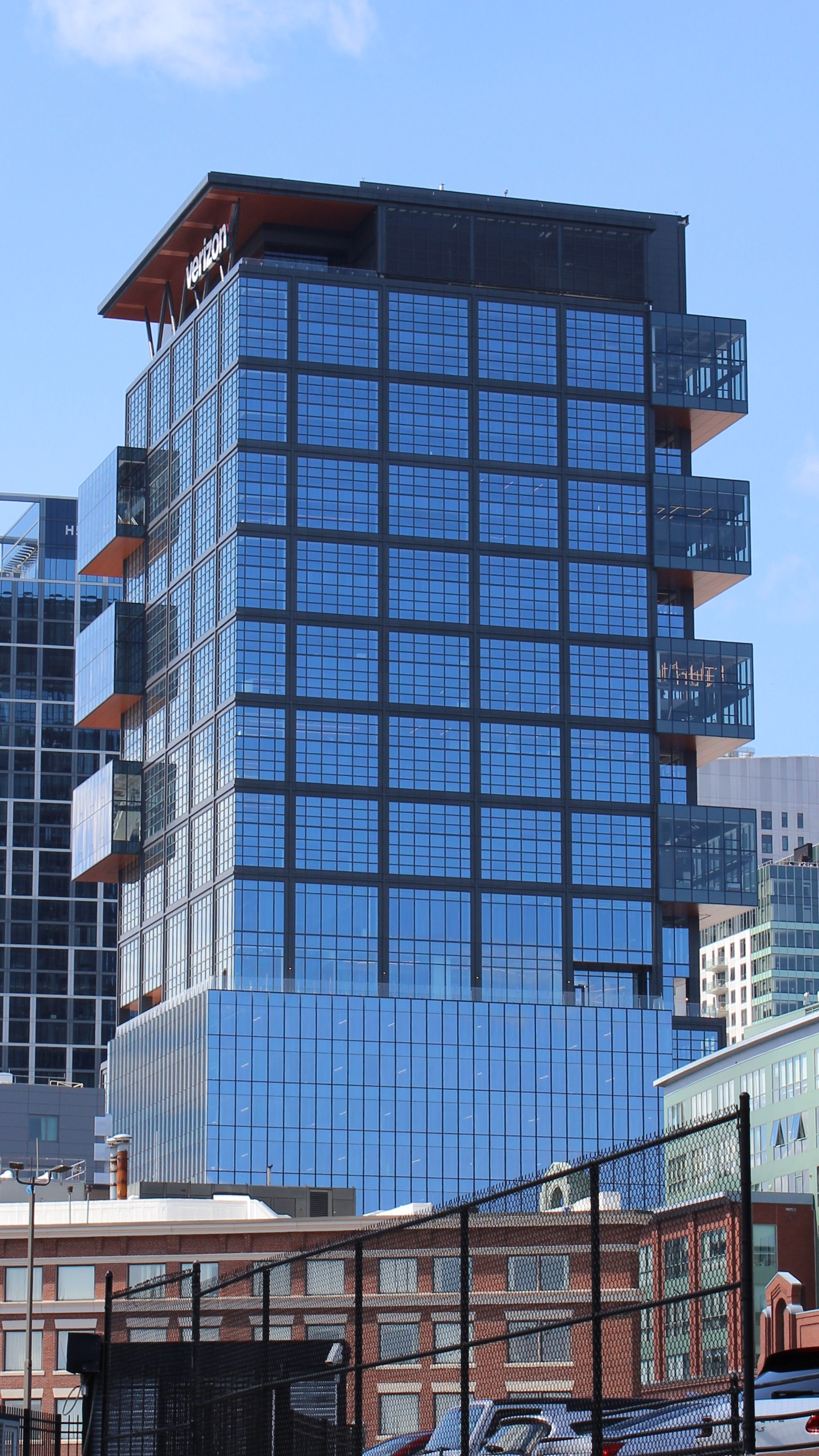

- Location within Boston

General information
- Status: Completed
- Type: Office, Retail
- Location: 100 & 120 Causeway St, Boston, MA 02114
- Coordinates: 42°21′57″N 71°03′40″W
- Groundbreaking: 2019
- Completed: May 18, 2021

Height
- Roof: 508 ft (155 m)

Technical details
- Floor count: 31
- Floor area: 651,500 sq ft (60,500 m^{2}) (Tower) 142,000 sq ft (13,200 m^{2}) (Tower podium)

Design and construction
- Architecture firm: Gensler, Stantec, and Solomon Cordwell Buenz
- Developer: Boston Properties and Delaware North

Other information
- Facilities: MBTA subway and commuter rail stations

The Hub on Causeway
- Hub50House
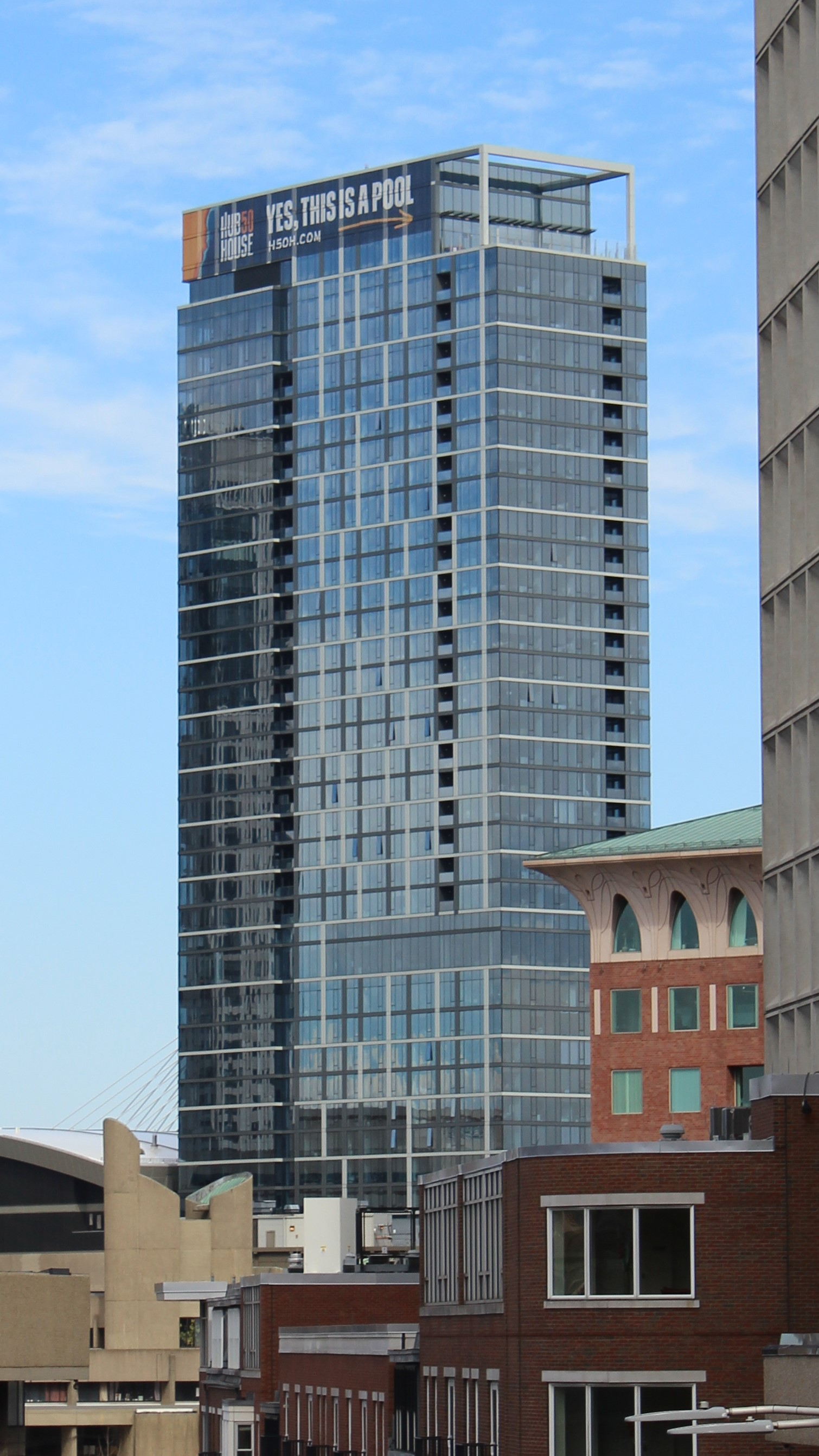

- Location within Boston

General information
- Status: Completed
- Type: Residential
- Location: 50 Causeway St, Boston, MA 02114
- Coordinates: 42°21′56″N 71°03′44″W
- Groundbreaking: 2017
- Completed: January 2020

Height
- Roof: 496 ft (151 m)

Technical details
- Floor count: 38

Design and construction
- Architecture firm: Gensler, Stantec, and Solomon Cordwell Buenz
- Developer: Boston Properties and Delaware North

Other information
- Facilities: MBTA subway and commuter rail stations

The Hub on Causeway is a 1,500,000 sq ft (139,400 m^{2}) mixed-use development in West End, Boston adjoining the TD Garden and North Station. It stands on the former site of Boston Garden, which was razed in 1998. Before its construction, the old Garden footprint served as employee parking. As of December 28, 2024, the Hub Office Tower is the 20th-tallest building in Boston, and the Hub Residential Tower is tied for the 25th-tallest building in Boston with the Berkeley Building.

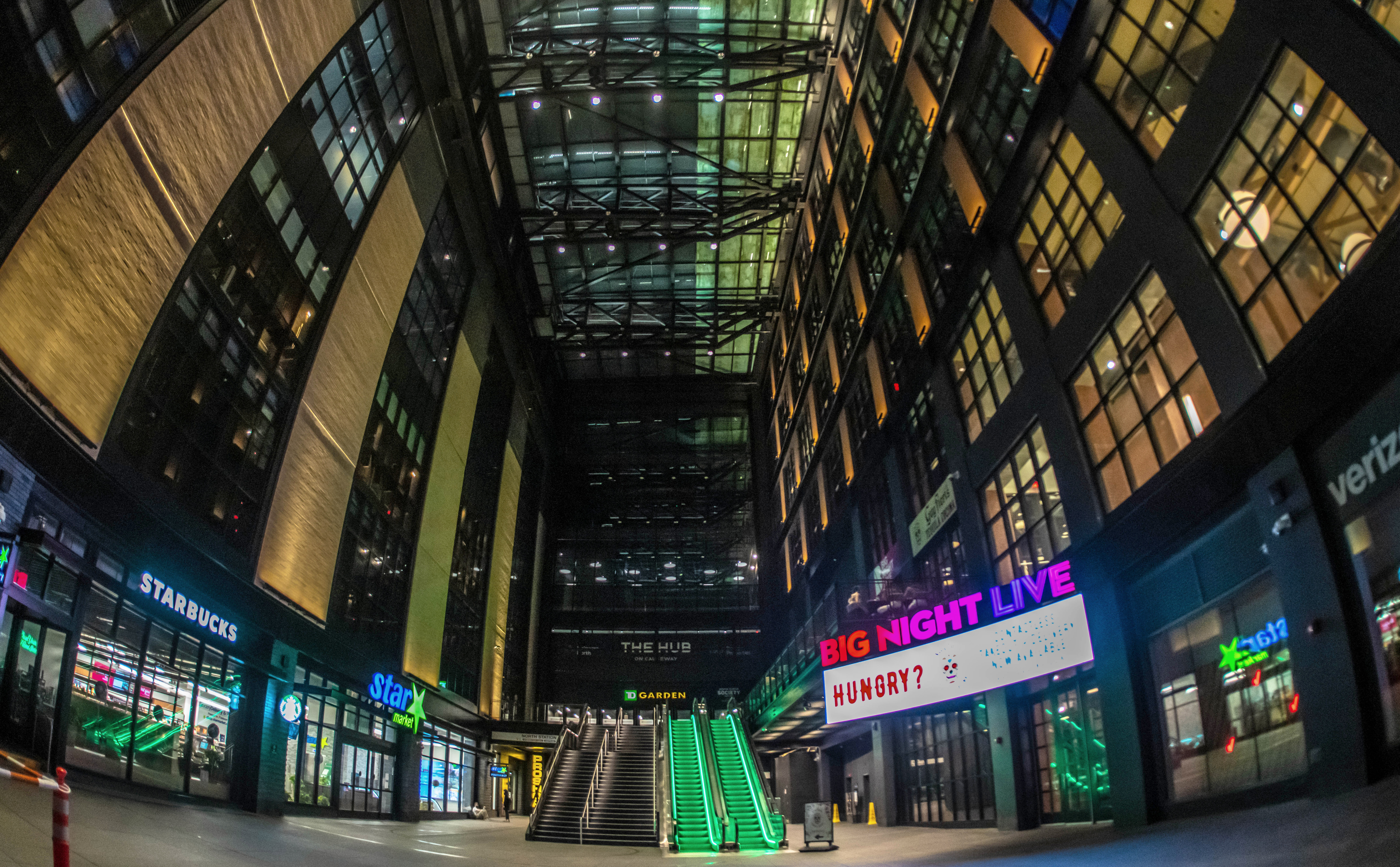
A commercial section of The Hub on Causeway, with stairs leading into the TD Garden

== Construction ==
Construction was performed in three phases, labeled as The Boston Garden Phase I, II, and III. Phase I improved or expanded North Station and the TD Garden and created buildings described as podiums that later phases built upon. Phase II added a residential tower, hotel, and retail area, and Phase III added an office tower.

== Buildings ==
The office tower is anchored by Verizon Communications. It also features the global headquarters of Rapid7. The building was certified LEED v3 Platinum in 2022.

The 440-unit luxury residential tower opened in November 2019.

The Hub Hall is a commercial area that opened with 18 food vendors in late 2021. Notable vendors include celebrity chef Masaharu Morimoto's first restaurant in New England, Momosan Ramen.

The 10-story, 272-room hotel CitizenM Boston North Station opened as part of Phase II construction.

ArcLight Cinema opened a 15-theatre venue in November 2019, but all locations were permanently closed due to the economic impact of the COVID-19 pandemic. In December 2022, AMC Theatres acquired the lease to the location. It reopened as part of the AMC chain in November 2023.

The 60,000 sq ft (5,600 m^{2}) Star Market located below the ground level of The Hub on Causeway is the largest grocery store in Boston by area.
