= Avast Secure Browser =

Chromium-based browser made by Avast

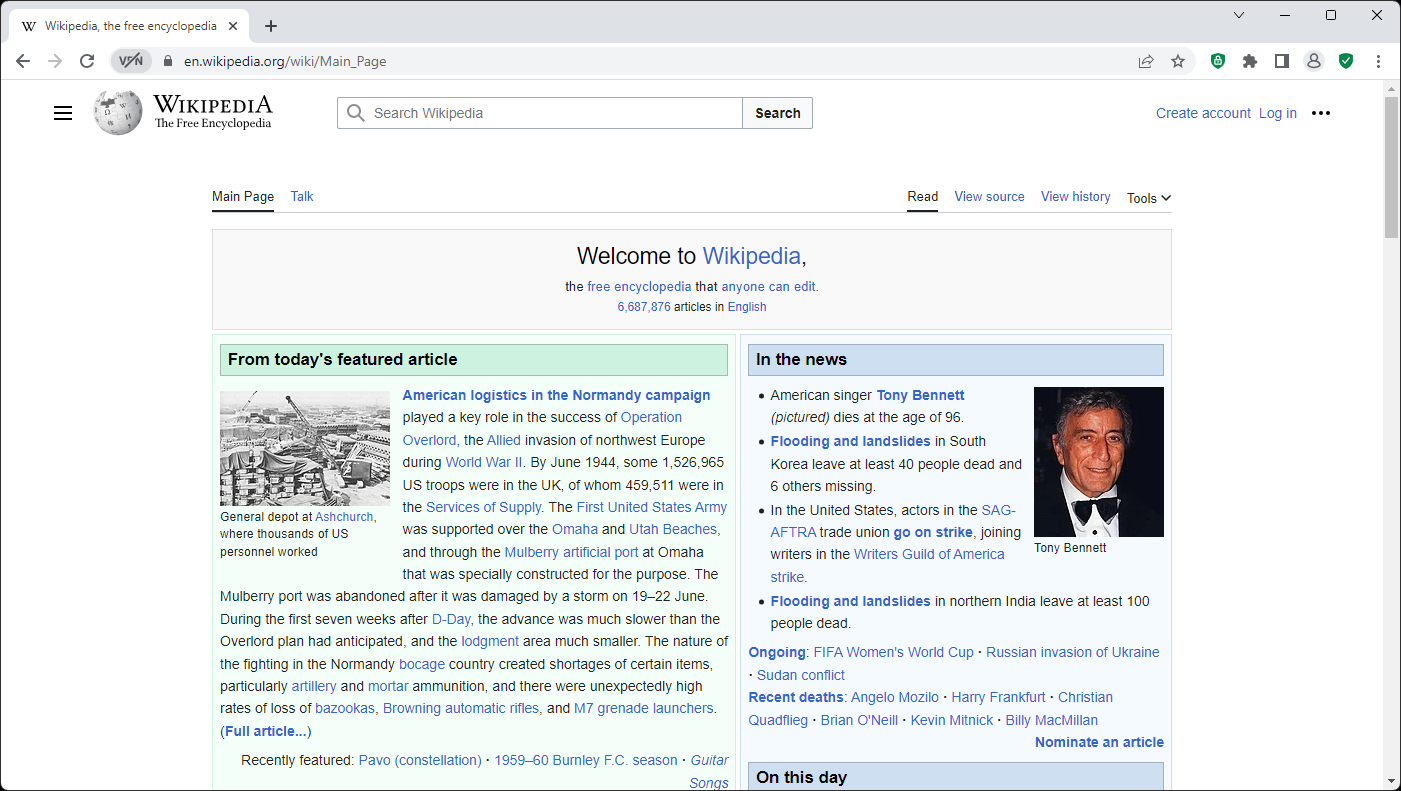
- Avast Secure Browser on Windows 11
- Developer: Avast
- Written in: Mainly C++, among others
- Website: www.avast.com/f-safezone

Avast Secure Browser (formerly Avast! SafeZone) is an Avast Software web browser included for optional installation in the Avast Antivirus installer since 2016, but it is also available on its website. It is based on the open source Chromium project. It is available for Microsoft Windows, macOS, iOS, and Android.

Avast Online Security is an extension for Google Chrome, Microsoft Edge, Mozilla Firefox and Opera browsers that has some similar features to Avast Secure Browser.

== Events ==
- 24 March 2016 – Avast! SafeZone Browser was launched.
- 6 April 2018 – Renamed to Avast Secure Browser and revamped.

== History ==
Initially, Avast Secure Browser was bundled with paid versions of Avast Antivirus. In March 2016, Avast started bundling it with the free version as well. Avast Secure Browser was originally called "SafeZone" before being revamped and rebranded as "Avast Secure Browser" in early 2018.

Before the revamp and rename, SafeZone's design was similar to that of the Opera browser. SafeZone turned on automatically when the user visited financial or shopping sites to conduct online transactions.

In December 2015, Tavis Ormandy identified a security vulnerability that could allow hackers to insert malicious JavaScript code into the browsers of Avast SafeZone Browser users. Avast quickly deployed a temporary fix and repaired the vulnerability a few days later.

== Features ==
- Video Downloader: A plug-in that offers to download videos being watched by the user on selected websites. It allows the user to choose video quality and, in some cases, to download the soundtrack of the video as an audio file.
- Anti-tracking and anti-fingerprinting: The software prevents the collection of information about the user's computer or browsing history that could be used to build a profile of the user.

== See also ==
- Comparison of web browsers
- List of web browsers
