= Andrea C. Ferrari =

Italian scientist

Andrea Carlo Ferrari
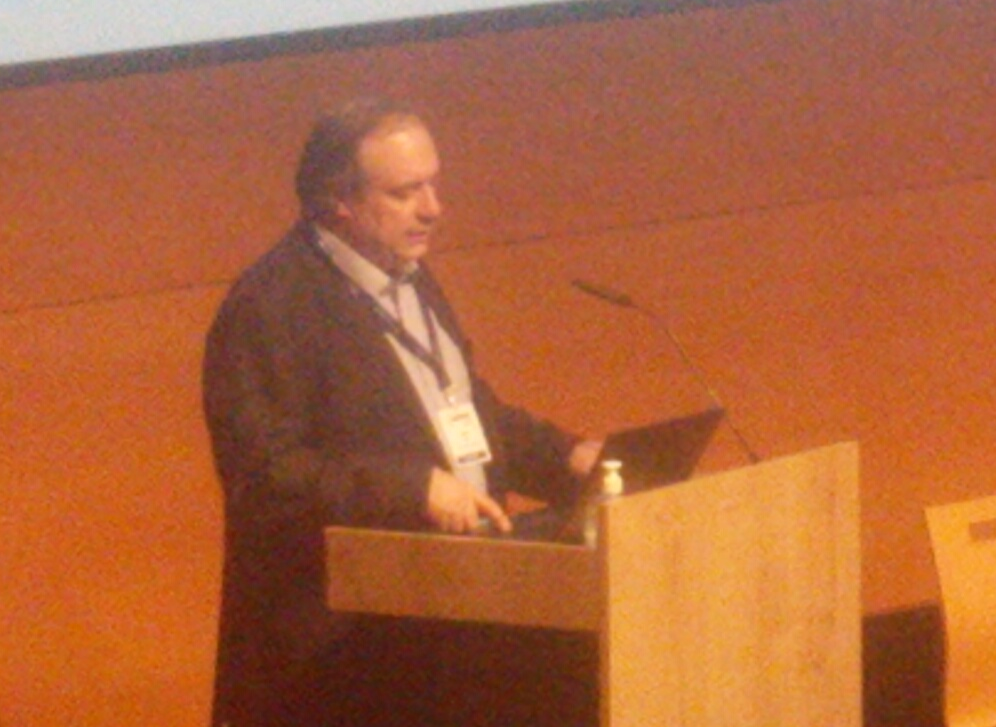
- Ferrari at GrapheneConf in 2021
- Born: Andrea Carlo Ferrari; November 1972 (age 53)
- Education: Polytechnic University of Milan
- Scientific career
- Fields: Graphene, 2D materials, carbon-based materials, photonics, optoelectronics.
- Workplaces: University of Cambridge
- Thesis: Nanoscale properties of amorphous carbon (2001)
- Website: http://www-g.eng.cam.ac.uk/nms/home.html

Andrea Carlo Ferrari (born 1972) is a professor of nanotechnology at the University of Cambridge. Ferrari is a researcher in graphene and related materials.

== Academic career ==
Ferrari earned a PhD in electrical engineering from the University of Cambridge after obtaining a Laurea in nuclear engineering at Polytechnic University of Milan, in Italy. He is the Founder and Director of the Cambridge Graphene Centre at the University of Cambridge, and the EPSRC Doctoral Training Centre in Graphene Technology. Prof. Ferrari is the Science and Technology Officer and the Chair of the Management Panel of the Graphene Flagship, one of the biggest research initiatives ever funded by the European Commission.

== Awards ==
Ferrari is a Fellow of the American Physical Society, the Institute of Physics, the Materials Research Society, the Optical Society, the European Academy of Sciences, the Royal Academy of Engineering, and the Royal Society of Chemistry. He is also a Member of Academia Europaea.

Ferrari has also received 4 European Research Council grants.

Ferrari's papers have been cited over 140,000 times, yielding a h-index of 126. He has been included on a number of highly cited researchers lists including the list of scientists with h-index beyond 100.
