= Emma Ciardi =

Italian painter (1879–1933)

- Born: 1879; Venice, Italy
- Died: 1933 (aged 53–54); Venice, Italy
- Known for: Painting

Emma Ciardi (1879–1933) was an Italian painter.

== Biography ==
Ciardi was born in Venice. Following in the footsteps of her father Guglielmo and brother Beppe, Emma Ciardi began painting as an adolescent and exhibited for the first time in 1900 at the Exposition Universelle in Paris, and at the Promotrice in Turin; in 1903 she participated in the Esposizione Internazionale d’Arte di Venezia and took part in it almost every year after that until 1932. In addition to her landscapes and views of Venice, she also soon made a name for herself with neo-18th-century subjects which were particularly well received by the English and American public. In 1910 she organised her first solo exhibition at the Leicester Galleries in London, followed by a second in 1913; she also had other exhibitions mounted in London by the Fine Art Society in 1928 and 1933. In the USA market she received acclaim from 1923 onwards, when she exhibited at the Howard Young Gallery in New York City, which obtained exclusive rights to selling her work. She died in Venice in 1933 and was interred at the San Michele cemetery on the Isola di San Michele in Venice.

Two years after her death, Ciardi’s painting was celebrated in a retrospective on the occasion of the fortieth anniversary of the Venice Biennale.

== Gallery ==
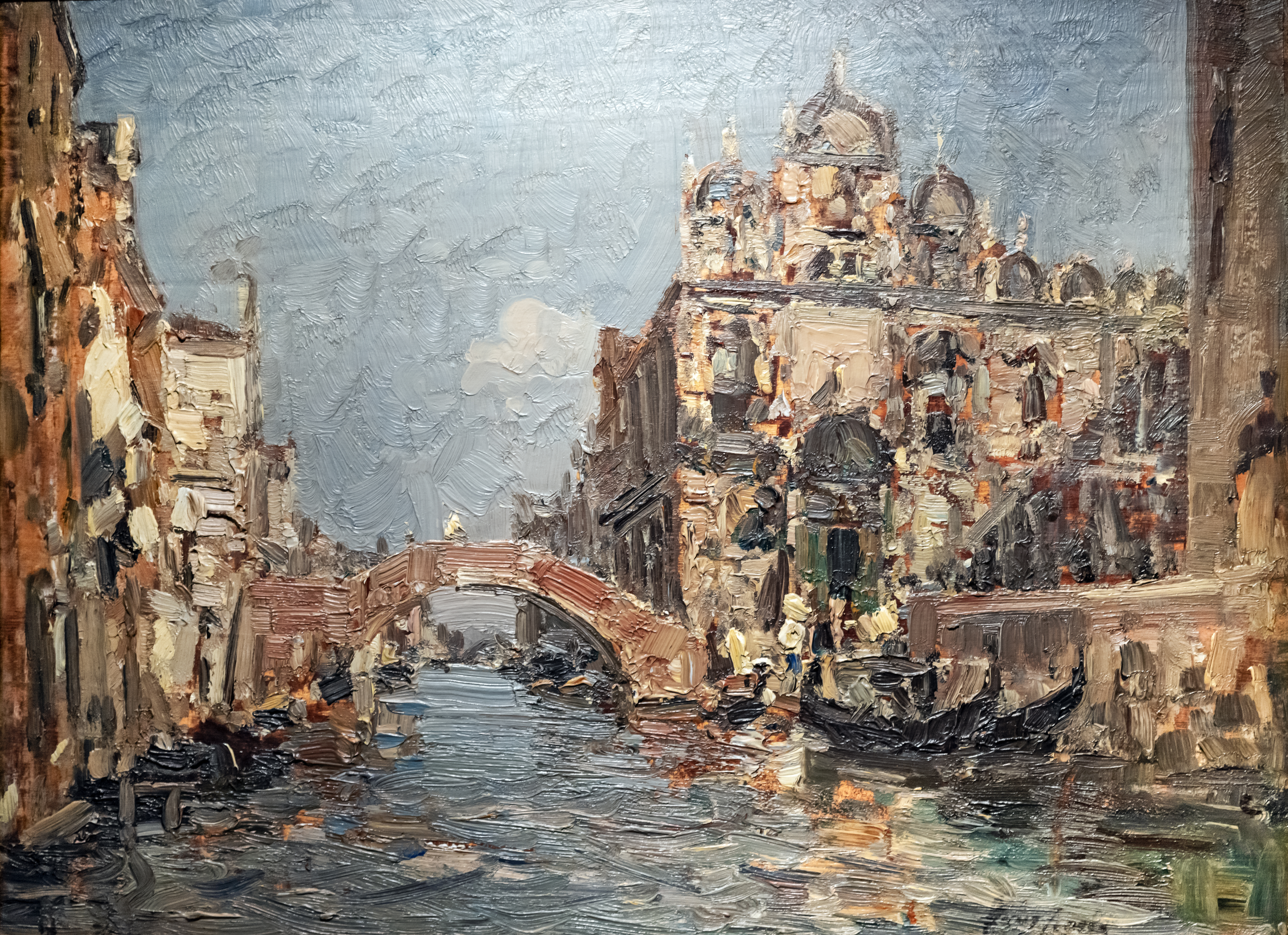
Canale dei Santi Giovanni e Paolo con la Scuola di San Marco
Ca' Rezzonico Venice

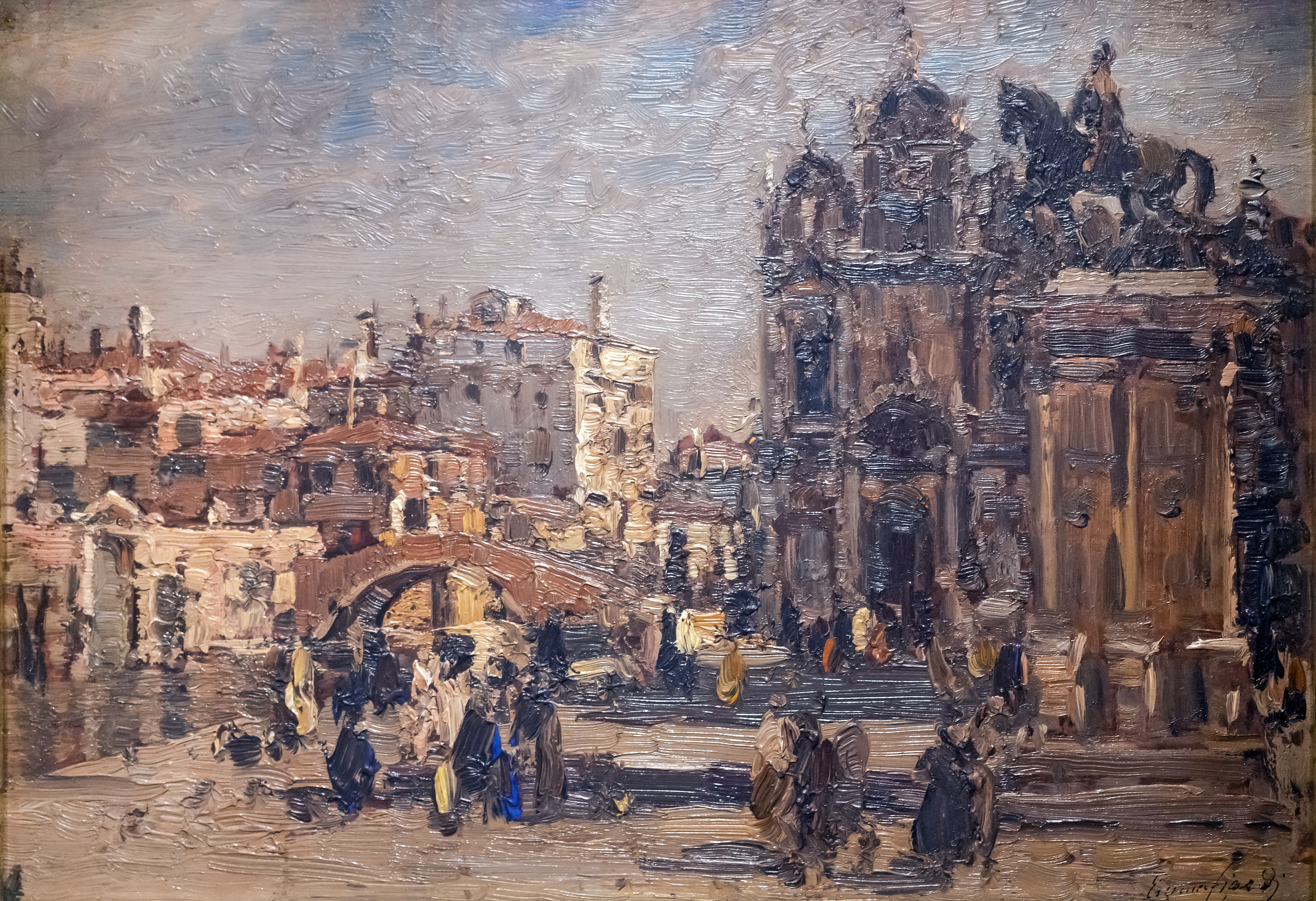
Rio di San Giovanni e Paolo
Ca' Rezzonico, Venice

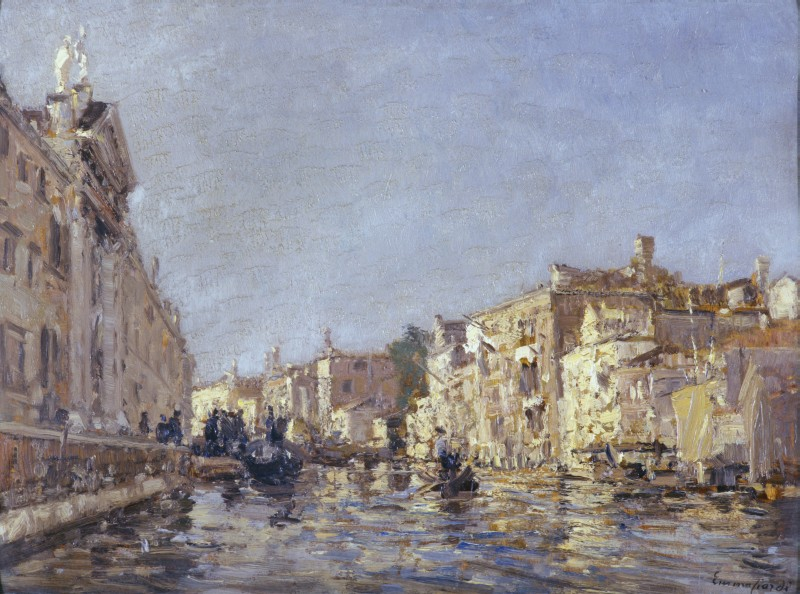
Rio di San Giovanni e Paolo a Venezia
(Fondazione Cariplo)

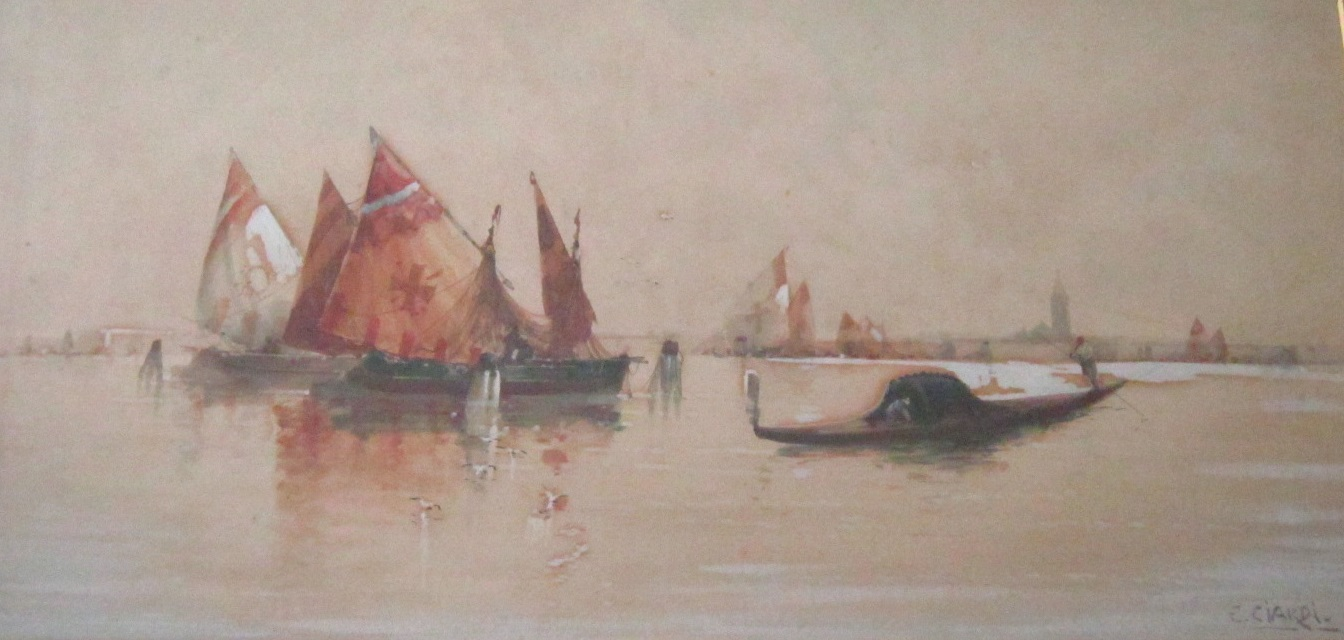
Barche nella laguna veneziana (Boats on the Venetian lagoon), 29 x 59, watercolour, private.
