= Beppe Ciardi =

Italian painter (1875–1932)

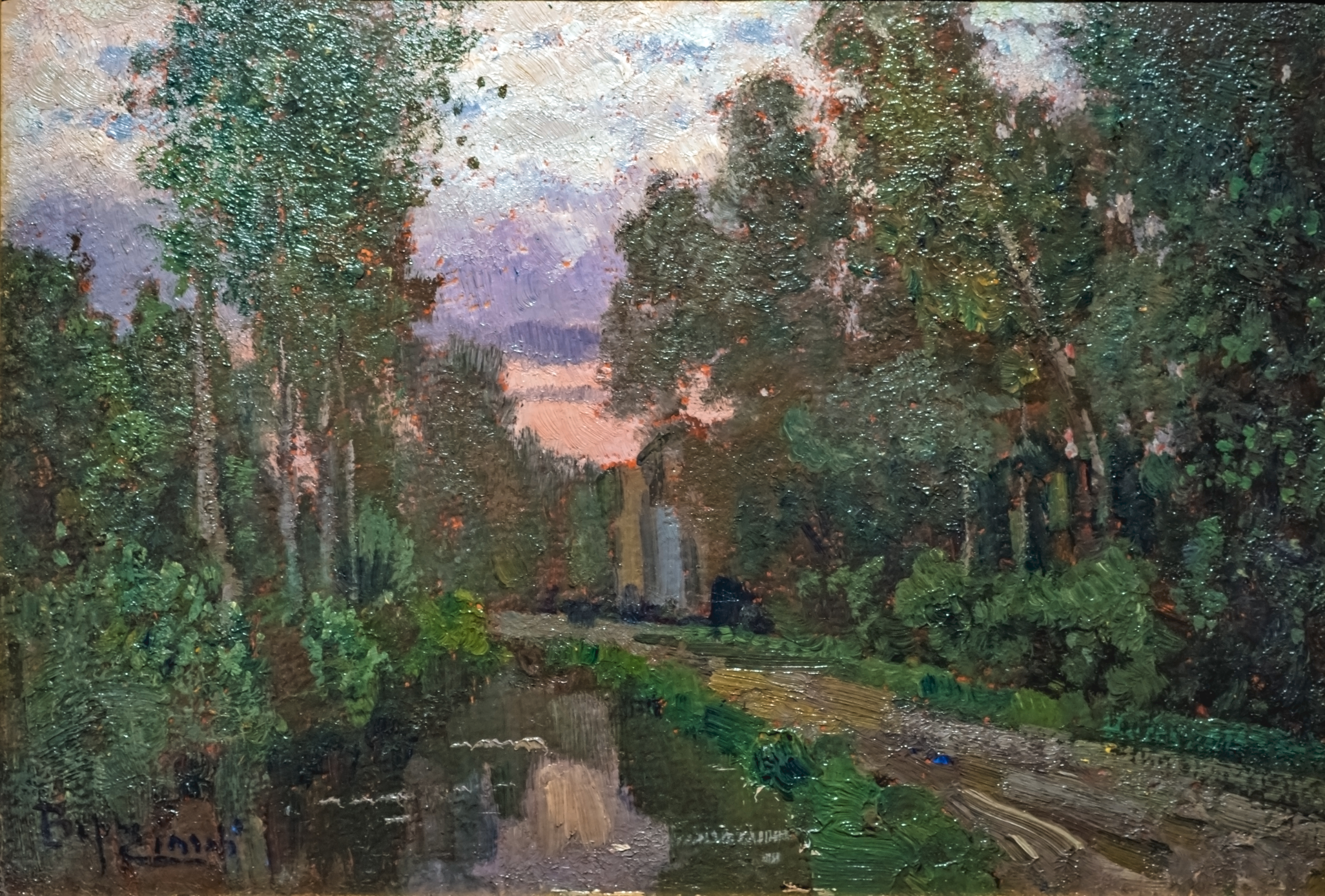
Paesaggio sul Sile (Ca' Rezzonico)

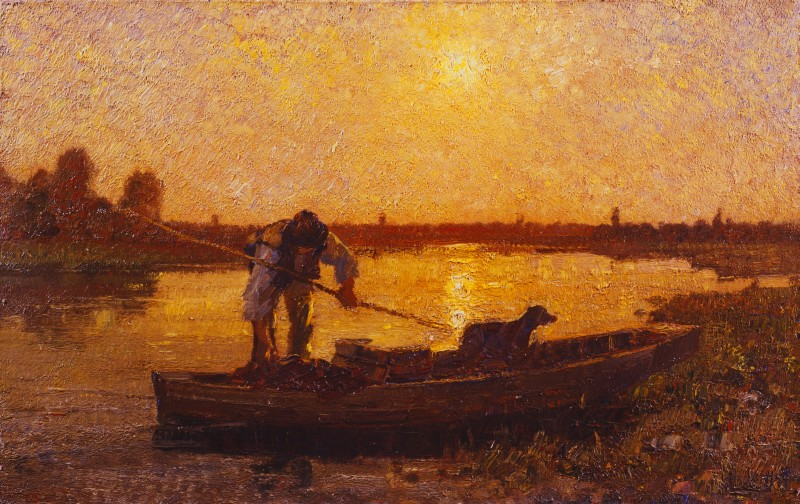
Sera sul Sile, 1925 ca. (Fondazione Cariplo)

Giuseppe "Beppe" Ciardi (1875–1932) was an Italian painter.

== Biography ==
Born in Venice, he was the son of the painter Guglielmo and the brother of Emma, who also became a notable artist. Beppe Ciardi studied under his father at the Venice Academy of Fine Arts from 1896. He graduated in 1899 and his participation in the Venice Biennale began the same year with the Esposizione Internazionale d’Arte di Venezia, where his work continued to be exhibited in later years and was featured in a solo show in 1912. The author of landscapes characterised by a symbolic interpretation of nature that won the esteem of critics, he was awarded the Fumagalli Prize in Milan (1900), a gold medal in Munich (1901) and a silver medal in San Francisco (1904). His work drew inspiration in later decades from everyday life in Venice and the countryside around Treviso. He died in the family villa at Quinto di Treviso in 1932.

== Other projects ==
Media related to Beppe Ciardi at Wikimedia Commons
