= Guglielmo Ciardi =

Italian painter (1842–1917)

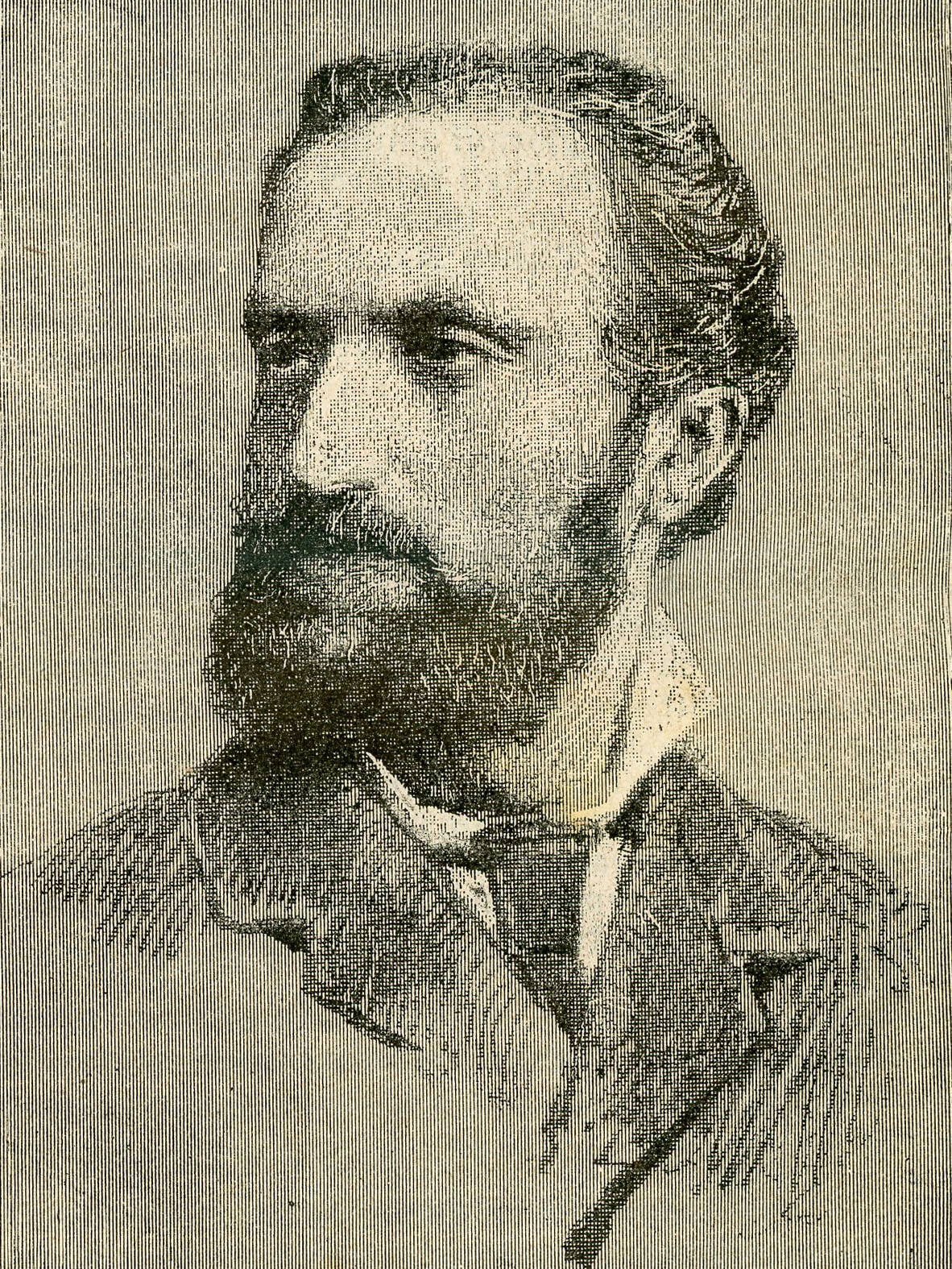
Guglielmo Ciardi

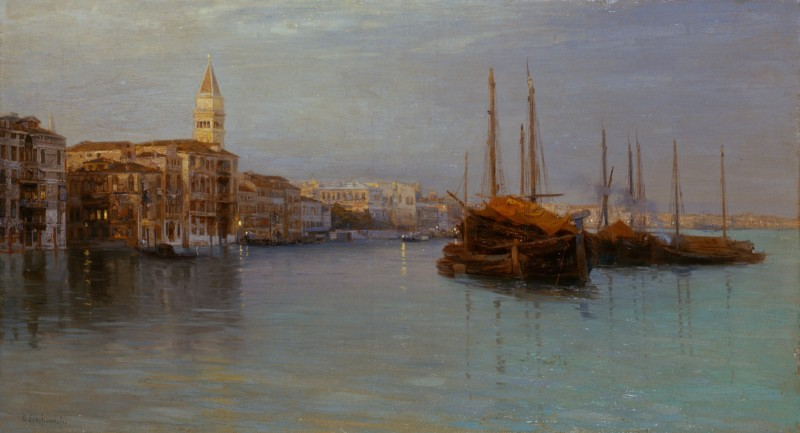
Sera – Canal Grande, ca. 1899 (Fondazione Cariplo)

Guglielmo Ciardi (13 September 1842 – 5 October 1917) was an Italian painter.

== Biography ==
He was born in Venice, the son of an official of the Austrian government. Ciardi enrolled in 1861 at the Venice Academy of Fine Arts, where he studied perspective with Federico Moja and landscape and seascape with Domenico Bresolin, taking over the latter’s teaching post in 1894. He went to Florence in 1868 and formed friendships with Giovanni Costa and the Macchiaioli painters. After spending some time in the countryside around Rome, he then arrived in Naples and came into contact with Filippo Palizzi and the artists of the Resina School. On his return to Venice the following year, he resumed his regular participation in the exhibitions of the Academy and the Società Promotrice di Belle Arti. Works were also sent to exhibitions in Milan, Turin, Genoa, Florence and Naples in the 1870s and 1880s.

He participated in the Milan Triennale during the 1890s, and in the Turin Exhibition of 1898 and the Venice Biennale from 1895 to 1914, with a solo show in 1909. Views of the Venetian lagoon and the countryside around Treviso were accompanied by mountain landscapes painted during his numerous stays in towns in Veneto, Trentino and Lombardy. Awarded a gold medal in 1915 at the San Francisco Exhibition, where the participants included his children Beppe and Emma, he was struck down by paralysis and died two years later.

== Other projects ==
Media related to Guglielmo Ciardi at Wikimedia Commons

- Biography and In Laguna at the Galleria Civica d'Arte Moderna at Turin.
