= Benedetta Ciardi =

Italian astrophysicist (born 1971)

Benedetta Ciardi (born 7 October 1971) is an Italian astrophysicist.

Ciardi was born in Florence. She is a staff member of the Max Planck Society at the Max Planck Institute for Astrophysics with a research focus on the reionization of the universe. She is the project lead at MPA for LOFAR. She is also an active member of International Astronomical Union (IAU) and affiliated with the IAU.

Her research interest lies in the field of Early structure formation and feedback effects, Reionization of the IGM, Radiative transfer, Observational probes, and 21cm line from neutral hydrogen atoms.

== Distinctions and awards ==
- W2 position on the Frauenförderungsprogramm of the MPG (Max-Planck-Gesellschaft), 2006 – 2011
- Marie Curie Excellence Award, 2004
- Postdoctoral Fellowship of the European Marie Curie Research and Training Network (RTN) program "The Physics of the Intergalactic Medium", Max-Planck-Institut für Astrophysik, Garching, Germany, 2002 – 2003
- Honourable mention at the Livio Gratton Prize for the best Italian doctoral thesis, 2003
- Postdoctoral Fellowship of the European Marie Curie Training and Mobility of Researchers (TMR) program "The Formation and the Evolution of Galaxies", Max-Planck-Institut für Astrophysik, Garching, Germany, 2001
- Predoctoral Fellowship of the Smithsonian Astrophysical Observatory, Center for Astrophysics | Harvard & Smithsonian, Cambridge, USA, 1999
- PhD Fellowship of the European Marie Curie Training and Mobility of Researchers (TMR) program, Theoretical Astrophysical Center, Copenhagen, Denmark, 1997
