= AVG Technologies =

Brand of cybersecurity, privacy, performance and utility applications

AVG Technologies B.V.
- Type: Subsidiary
- Founded: 1991; 35 years ago
- Founder: Tomáš Hofer and Jan Gritzbach
- Fate: Merged into Avast, brand still used
- Headquarters: Brno, Czech Republic
- Area served: Worldwide
- Products: Software
- Parent: Avast
- Website: www.avg.com

AVG Technologies B.V. is a brand of cybersecurity, privacy, performance and utility software applications for desktop computers and mobile devices developed by Avast, a part of Gen Digital. As of 2026, AVG offers anti-virus, a secure browser, firewall, anti-tracking, VPN, and device performance software for Windows, MacOS, Android, and iOS. Many are offered as freeware, earning revenues from advertisers and from users that upgrade to paid versions to access more features.

AVG was founded in 1991 in Czechoslovakia. In the early 2000s, AVG expanded internationally and used money from venture capital investments to fund a series of acquisitions. AVG went public on the New York Stock Exchange in February 2012. Avast acquired AVG for $1.3 billion in July 2016.

In 2022, Avast and Norton became Gen Digital.

== History ==
AVG Technologies was founded by Tomáš Hofer and Jan Gritzbach in 1991 under the name Grisoft in Brno, Czechoslovakia. Initially, Grisoft sold IT equipment and third-party software, in addition to its own antivirus product. Grisoft grew as the country loosened its international trade policies, so it could exchange technology with companies in Europe. By 1998, Grisoft had 13 employees.

Grisoft later expanded to the US market, creating an American company called AVG. Grisoft also expanded to the United Kingdom, the Netherlands, Germany, and other countries. For a time, the company was focused on bulk sales of antivirus software to computer manufacturers that sold PCs with Grisoft's software pre-installed. It started marketing software directly to consumers in 2006. In 2008, Grisoft changed the name of its parent company to AVG, the name already used for its software and for its American subsidiary. TA Associates invested an additional $200 million into the company that year for a minority stake in the business.

In 2001, Grisoft was sold to a venture capital firm Benson Oak Capital. The firm then sold a 65 percent interest in Grisoft to Intel Capital and Enterprise Investors for $52 million in 2005. The investments were used to fund a series of acquisitions. Grisoft bought spyware company Ewido Networks in 2006 and browser security company Exploit Prevention Labs in 2007. In 2009, AVG announced the acquisition of Sana Security, which analyzes software behavior. This was followed by the acquisition of mobile security startup DroidSecurity and iMedix Web Technologies in 2011, parental control software company Bsecure in 2012, and remote monitoring company Level Platforms in 2013.

AVG Technologies filed an initial public offering in February 2012. Additionally, former Mozilla CEO Gary Kovacs was appointed CEO of AVG. He led the effort to create a simple one-page privacy policy that discloses what data the company collects from users and what information about free users it sells to advertisers.

In 2014, AVG announced the acquisition of Location Labs, a cybersecurity company focused on mobile devices, for an estimated $220 million. AVG was acquired by Avast for $1.3 billion in July 2016. By this time, AVG had 600 employees, $155 million in annual revenue, and 95 million users. The combined entity became the world's largest antivirus company, with an estimated 20% of the market. There were Avast or AVG installations on 160 million mobile devices and 240 million desktop computers. The new combined entity incorporate their technology into combined software products and developed a new channel program to market them to small business owners. A few months later, an American private equity firm, TA Associates, bought a 25 percent interest in AVG for $200 million.

In 2015, AVG acquired the VPN company Privax and an Israeli-based gallery app company called MyRoll. It also released new software products for businesses that incorporate the technology of both companies. In July 2017 AVG acquired Piriform Software, a UK-based company that developed CCleaner, a cleanup utility with 130 million installations.

== Software ==
AVG develops and markets software for IT security, privacy, performance optimization, and other utility services on desktop computers and mobile devices. It is one of the largest brands of cybersecurity software.

AVG also develops software for data backup, parental controls, and other services. AVG produces a variety of other computer optimization and utility software products. For example, a browser extension called AVG SafePrice looks for better deals online when the user is on a shopping site.

A majority of AVG's revenues come from free users upgrading to paid versions.

=== AVG AntiVirus ===
AVG is best-known for its antivirus product. AVG AntiVirus is a freeware program that relies heavily on heuristic analysis to determine if a program's code is behaving like malicious software. It scans a computer's documents, programs, and emails for suspicious behavior, then rates each file's risk based on its behavior and alerts the user of files with a high rating. AVG Antivirus has features intended to protect the user's PC from malware, phishing, and viruses. It also has firewall, identity protection, anti-ransomware, anti-spam, and webcam control features for paid users.

=== AVG Secure Browser ===
AVG Secure Browser is a web browser that has built-in ad blocker. The browser works on Windows, macOS and Android. As of 2024 it had approximately 0.02% market share.

=== AVG PC TuneUp ===
AVG PC TuneUp is a software suite for Microsoft Windows computers that allows users to "manage, maintain, optimize, configure, and troubleshoot a computer system."

== Controversy ==
In May 2012, AVG Technologies issued a copyright claim, referred to as a 'takedown request,' for a YouTube video of 1987 pop song "Never Gonna Give You Up", performed by British singer Rick Astley. The video was restored within 24 hours by YouTube. The video's name refers to the internet meme commonly referred to as 'Rickrolling,' where someone pranks others by tricking them into going to the video.

In 2016, AVG's browser add-on, AVG Secure Search, was criticized as being adware, for being bundled with other software and mistakenly installed. AVG Secure Search was also advertised to users of the free versions of AVG products. Some reviews at the time noted that, although the add-on offers legitimate malware-blocking capabilities, the default behavior of changing the web browser's default search engine, homepage, and new tab page to AVG Secure Search was reminiscent of a potentially unwanted program (PUP), problems uninstalling the add-on were reported, and the add-on could potentially make a web browser more vulnerable to attacks. Later, AVG fixed these problems in its browser extension.
