= Veritas Storage Foundation =

Computer software product

Veritas Storage Foundation (VSF), previously known as Veritas Foundation Suite, is a computer software product made by Veritas Software that combines Veritas Volume Manager (VxVM) and Veritas File System (VxFS) to provide online-storage management. Symantec Corporation developed and maintained VSF until January 29, 2016, at which point Veritas and Symantec separated. The latest product version, 7.0, was re-branded as "Veritas InfoScale 7.0".

Veritas Storage Foundation provides:

- Dynamic storage tiering (DST)
- Dynamic multipathing (DMP)
- RAID support

== Major releases ==
Veritas Storage Foundation was also packaged in bundles such as Veritas Storage Foundation Veritas Cluster Server, for databases, for Oracle RAC, and Veritas Cluster File System.

- Veritas InfoScale Enterprise 7.0, December 2015
- Veritas Storage Foundation 6.0, December 2011
- Veritas Storage Foundation 5.1, December 2009
- Veritas Storage Foundation Basic 4.x and 5.x, February 2007, free version, impose usage limits
- Veritas Storage Foundation 5.0, July 2006
- Veritas Storage Foundation 4.3 (Windows-only release), August 2005
- Veritas Storage Foundation 4.2 (Windows-only release), December 2004
  - Support Microsoft Multipath I/O (MPIO) (only Windows 2003)
  - Includes Veritas Volume Replicator (VVR)
- Veritas Storage Foundation 4.1, May 2004
- Veritas Storage Foundation 4.0
- Veritas Foundation Suite 3.5
- Veritas Foundation Suite 3.4
- Veritas Foundation Suite 2.2

Supported OS platforms included AIX, Solaris, HP-UX, Red Hat Linux, SUSE Linux and Microsoft Windows.

== See also ==
- Veritas Volume Manager (VxVM)
- Veritas File System (VxFS)
- Symantec Operations Readiness Tools (SORT)
