= Symantec Operations Readiness Tools =

Software product from Symantec

- Platform: Cross-platform
- Type: Cloud computing
- License: proprietary
- Website: sort.symantec.com

On March 15, 2011, Symantec released Symantec Operations Readiness Tools (SORT), an updated version of Veritas Operations Services (VOS).

SORT (formerly VOS) is a web-based suite of services introduced by Symantec Corporation in 2008 that supports Symantec enterprise products, such as Veritas Storage Foundation, Veritas Cluster Server (VCS), and NetBackup.

SORT collects environmental data from IBM AIX, HP-UX, Linux, Solaris, and Microsoft Windows servers. SORT identifies risks in data centers and provides remediation recommendations.

Symantec does not currently charge its customers for SORT.

== Process ==
SORT uses a data collector to collect configuration and environmental data about Veritas Volume Manager (VxVM), Veritas File System (VxFS), VCS, NetBackup, and other Symantec enterprise products. The data are analyzed for potential problems and risks, which are summarized in reports.

SORT produces three types of reports about Symantec enterprise products:

- Product and licensing inventory
- Installation and upgrade
- Risk assessment

SORT performs environment-specific checks to produce these reports. The risk assessment report, for example, is based on 155 separate checks.

=== Product and licensing inventory report ===
The product and licensing inventory report lists installed software binaries and license keys.

=== Installation and upgrade report ===
The installation and upgrade report lists environment-specific prerequisites that must be met before installing or upgrading Symantec enterprise products. For example, the report lists required operating system patches that need to be installed before installing a Symantec enterprise product.

=== Risk assessment report ===
The risk assessment report provides an environment-specific configuration assessment with recommendations to increase performance, availability, and utilization.

For example, one of the checks in the risk assessment report lists volumes whose mirrors are composed of logical units from the same disk array. Logical volumes that are mirrored have higher availability when mirrored across separate disk array controllers. Mirroring logical volumes across separate disk array controllers allows the logical volumes to continue to operate should one disk array fail.

== See also ==
- Veritas Cluster File System
- Veritas Cluster Server
- Veritas File System
- Veritas Storage Foundation
- Veritas Volume Manager
- Veritas Volume Replicator
