= AVG =

AVG may refer to:

- Akademische Verlagsgesellschaft, a former German publishing house
- Average, a statistical measurement
- AVG Technologies, a Czech company that develops antivirus and internet security software
  - AVG (software), a range of antivirus and internet security software from AVG Technologies
- Automatic voltage gain, automatic control of electronic amplification level
- American Volunteer Group, volunteer air force units organized by the United States government in 1941 and 1942
- Auxiliary aircraft ferry (United States Navy hull classification symbol), a type of escort carrier
- Aretired US Navy hull classification symbol: Auxiliary aircraft escort vessel (AVG)
- Albtal-Verkehrs-Gesellschaft, a public transport operator in the area of Karlsruhe, Germany
- Aardappelen, vlees, groente (potatoes, meat, vegetables), the standard fare in Dutch cuisine
- Advanced Variable Geo, title used for console games in the Variable Geo series of fighting games
- The AVG, better known as the Flying Tigers
