= Q&A (Symantec) =

Database and word processing software program

- Developer: Symantec
- Release: 1985; 41 years ago
- Final release: 5.0 / September 1998; 28 years ago
- Operating system: MS-DOS, Windows
- Type: Flat file database and Word processor
- License: Proprietary EULA

Q&A was a database and word processing software program for IBM PC–compatible computers published by Symantec and partners from 1985 to 1998. It was written by a team headed by Symantec founder Dr. Gary Hendrix, Denis Coleman, and Gordon Eubanks.

Released by Symantec in 1985 for MS-DOS computers, Q&A's flat-file database and integrated word processing application was cited as a significant step towards making computers less intimidating and more user-friendly. One of its features was a natural language search function that utilized a 600-word internal vocabulary.

== Product evolution ==
Q&A Software was originally a natural language research project, involving a group of former SRI International researchers led by Dr. Earl Sacerdoti and Dr. Gary Hendrix. It was funded first by the National Science Foundation Small Business Innovation Research Program, and later by venture capital investors including Kleiner Perkins. Q&A later evolved into both a useful business productivity tool and the foundation of Symantec. The professional poker player Barry Greenstein worked on the Q&A word processor during his employment at Symantec.

Dr. Hendrix believed that only time would tell whether Q&A's integrated natural language ability would be merely a passing fad or a valuable asset.

The product gained popularity and generated nearly $1.4 million in 1985.

By the end of the fiscal year 1989, after the release of Version 3.0, Q&A accounted for nearly a third of Symantec's $50 million revenues, occupying the top spot in the flat-file database market in 1991.

=== Version 1.0 and 1.1 ===
Q&A 1.0 manual

Version 1.0 came out in November 1985. It was designed to look and work like pfs:File and pfs:Write. It has the natural language capability to answer English questions about the database.

=== Version 2.0 ===
Version 2.0 came out in late 1986. It included a "Recover" function to make damaged databases usable again and expanded capabilities to import data from dBase II (and III) as well as Lotus 1-2-3. The software had been prepared for internationalization and achieved this when a German version (called F&A (in German)) was released, followed by release in several other languages.

=== Version 3.0 ===
Version 3.0 was released in the spring of 1988. Users of this version could now use a database on a local area network, simultaneously. Data records were locked so that users could edit different records at the same time. If a user was editing a record, it would be locked for other users. These other users would merely see a message saying a user was editing the record. Stored reports and other specifications however, could be edited at the same time. Reports could be run and even if they ran slowly their results would be drawn from a consistent set of data as it appeared at the time the report began to execute. This multi-user functionality was described by Symantec as new to the low-end PC database market.

With a function called XLOOKUP, Q&A 3.0 could be programmed to bring values from an external database into the currently open one—a step toward relational database functionality.

=== Version 4.0 for MS-DOS and Windows ===
Q&A 4.0 for MS-DOS box

Released for Windows in 1993, Version 4.0 boasted a plethora of new features; two new views (Form View and Spreadsheet View), the ability to choose file names from a dialog box, and a simple control panel (favorably compared to the controls of a VCR).

Symantec attempted to develop a Macintosh version of Q&A at the same time as their Windows effort. This occurred at their Monterey Development Center. It would have been a functional equivalent with a Macintosh flavor. Sadly, they were unable to complete the project and it was scrapped.

Perhaps more anticipated was an improvement on Q&A's original natural language technology which appeared in the Windows version. Called DAVE—Do Anything Very Easily—in 4.0, the natural language query feature was possessed of two aspects: Intelligent Assistant, which allowed users to navigate easily amongst records using basic English queries created by clicking entries in the toolbar, and Scripting Assistant, which permitted the creation of scripts within the application to automate commonly used, repetitive tasks, as opposed to the keystroke recorded macros used by the DOS version.

Version 4.0 included a fully functional word processor—Q&A Write—that could be launched from Q&A or used as a stand-alone application. Q&A Write featured a 100,000-word spell check, a 660,000-word thesaurus, a dictionary, formatting options such as page layout, columnar formatting, automatic page numbering and headers, as well as support for the addition of graphics. Additionally, it offered multi-font printing support and the ability to hot-link elements of a Lotus 1-2-3 document, Symphony spreadsheet, or Lotus PIC graphs, to Q&A Write documents. Macros could be stored in an ASCII text file created with a text editor, Q&A Write, or by recording keys; the Macro menu could be accessed from many locations by pressing Shift-F2.

In keeping with previous versions, Q&A 4.0 was fully backward compatible, allowing users to easily access data created in prior versions of the software. This version is largely considered the “classic” Q&A.

The (customer) contact management software ACT!, another earlier Symantec product now being continued by the SAGE group, also had the ability to read Q&A data files.

=== Last years ===
In 1994, Symantec announced that it would no longer continue to develop Q&A. Amid public outcry, particularly from the Q&A User Group, Symantec was forced to reconsider and commissioned PFP Software GmbH of Düsseldorf to develop an upgrade to the MS-DOS version. Released in 1995 first only in Europe, then later in the US in response to demands from the extremely vocal user base, Andreas Göbel's Version 5.0 addressed interoperability issues, added more user control over form colors and introduced the ability to Copy/Paste between fields.

Although Symantec continued to sell both Versions 4.0 and 5.0, neither was actively marketed, and in September 1998, all sales and support of Q&A were halted.

== Alternative application ==
Shortly before the cessation of Q&A sales, a joint venture between Professional Computer Technology Associates (PCTA) and Marble Publications led by longtime Q&A users William Halpern and Tom Marcellus began negotiating with Symantec to address the issues facing long-term Q&A users. By the time Q&A sales and support had been halted, Symantec was actively referring users with questions to the venture, with sales inquiries going to PCTA, and support inquiries going to both PCTA and Marble Publications.

Recognizing that Q&A would lapse into obsolescence as advances in hardware and software moved forward, Halpern and a group of Q&A "power users" began meeting in 1999 to address the possibility of developing a new product—compatible with Q&A databases—to allow users to migrate seamlessly without losing their important data. In 2000, Halpern's group became Lantica Software LLC, which released its first version of Sesame Database Manager in 2003.

== Reception ==
Although disliking "that damned bouncing ball at the bottom of the screen", BYTE columnist Jerry Pournelle said in March 1986 that "Q&A has such a nice text editor that I'd seriously consider using it as my primary writing tool". In October 1987 he said that although he would keep using WordPerfect, Q&A Write was superior in handling blocks of text. Pournelle named Q&A Write the text editor of the month for July 1988, stating that the newest version "fixes most of the problems I mentioned in previous reviews. I'll say one thing about Symantec, they listen". He wrote fondly of the software, claiming it as his sole word processor.

A 1988 PC Magazine reader survey found that 2% used Q&A Write. A 1990 American Institute of Certified Public Accountants member survey found that 4% of respondents used Q&A as their database, and 1% as their word processor.

== See also ==
- Comparison of office suites
