= K9 Web Protection =

Discontinued content control software

K9 Web Protection for Windows and Mac OS
- Developer: Blue Coat Systems
- Final release: 4.5, according to the release notes
- Operating system: Windows, macOS Android (operating system)
- Type: Content-control software
- License: Proprietary; free for home use
- Website: k9webprotection.com (archive.org)
- As of: August 2016

K9 Web Protection is discontinued content-control software developed by Blue Coat Systems. In 2016, K9 Web Protection was acquired by Symantec as part of the company's purchase of Blue Coat Systems. In April 2019, Symantec announced that K9 Web Protection would be discontinued and would no longer be made available for download or purchase. Technical support for the software ended on June 30, 2019.

== Use ==
The software operates without downloading a database to the computer and instead looks to an Internet-based database. This means that the computer only needs a very small piece of code and the user can take advantage of the database being updated constantly. On the other hand, if the computer cannot connect to this database for any reason (such as a firewall blocking the connection), all web access will be disabled.

K9 Web Protection is proprietary software which is free for home use. It is possible to have multiple licenses, and every computer needs a separate license. Its primary purpose is for parental control, but it is possible to use it for protection of their computer against computer viruses or malware, or for self-blocking of pornography (with an accountability partner).

== Strengths ==
The software is very difficult to disable or remove without an administrator password. The uninstaller requires the administrator password to run, and if the service or process is stopped all web access is disabled. Similarly, attempts to modify the program from the windows registry or file system will also lead to all web access being disabled.

== Reception ==
Ken Cooper from Family WebWatch praised its ease of use and clean interface. Cooper also praised K9 for not bogging down system performance because it uses an Internet-based database.

On the other hand, Neil J. Rubenking, lead analyst for security for PC Magazine criticized the filter's inability to create custom filtering for individual family members, while praising the fact that he could not find a way for children to disable the filter without also disabling access to the internet.

Cnet gave it a 4 (out of 5) star rating and ranks it #8 in Parental Control. Cnet criticizes "the lack of a chatware filter" which "leaves some holes for predation".

== See also ==
- List of parental control software
