= Pilette =

Pilette is a surname. Notable people with the surname include:

- André Pilette (1918–1993), Belgian racing driver
- Teddy Pilette (born 1942), Belgian racing driver
- Théodore Pilette (1883–1921), Belgian racing driver
- Vincent Pilette, American businessman
