= Greg Clark (businessman) =

Australian businessman

Gregory S. Clark is an Australian businessman, He founded the computer company Dascom, later to become part of Tivoli Software. He was the CEO of Symantec.

Clark graduated from Griffith University in Brisbane, Australia, where he obtained a BSc.

== Business background ==
Clark started a computer company called Dascom with labs on the Gold Coast of Queensland and Santa Cruz, California. In 1999, Dascom was acquired by IBM's Tivoli Software division.

Clark has been subsequently associated with the following companies:

- IBM Tivoli
- E2open, Inc.
- Mincom
- Blue Coat, Inc.
- Blue Coat Systems Inc
- Anonyome Labs Inc
- Emulex
- Global Healthcare Exchange
- Imperva
- Inteligreated
- Aconex
- Symantec

He was the CEO of Symantec until May 9, 2019.

== Published works ==
He is the co-author of Security intelligence: a practitioner's guide to solving enterprise security challenges (2015).
