= X1 Discovery =

X1 Discovery, Inc.
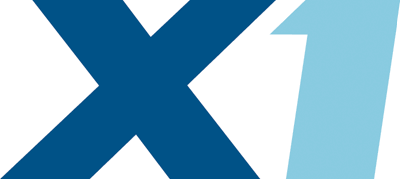
- Company type: Private (venture-backed)
- Industry: Computer Software
- Founded: 2003
- Headquarters: Pasadena, California
- Key people: Craig Carpenter, CEO
- Website: www.x1.com

X1 Discovery, Inc., previously known as X1 Technologies, Inc., is a privately held software company, based in Pasadena, California, United States, that develops and markets products for people and organizations that need to find information quickly. It is an operating company of Idealab, and is backed by U.S. Venture Partners.

== History ==
X1 was founded in 2003, as X1 Technologies, Inc., to sell products that allow business users to access the information that resides on one computer or across the corporate enterprise. The products feature a "find-as-you-type" interface that narrows the results list as each letter of the search term is typed or an entry is made in the metadata field, without requiring the user to press the search button again. Result details are listed in the left pane of the interface, and a preview of the file or email is displayed in the right pane. X1 searches almost 500 file-types, including email, Outlook and enterprise applications such as Oracle and Symantec Enterprise Vault even if the user does not have the associated application installed on their PC.

In late 2005, X1 entered the enterprise search market with its Enterprise Edition, which consisted of a network-based indexing server that delivers results to the Desktop Edition (now X1 Search) or via a browser client interface. In 2013, the full suite of X1 products was combined under X1. In 2015 PCMag awards Editor's Choice to X1 for "Best Desktop Search" solution and Gartner names X1 a "Cool Vendor in Endpoint Computing".

X1 was listed as one of KMWorld's "100 Companies That Matter in Knowledge Management" for four years, and as one of Gartner's "Cool Vendors in the High Performance Workplace" in 2006. It also won a PC Magazine's Award for Technical Excellence in 2004, and was reviewed by EContent Magazine. X1 has partnered with and powered search initiatives for IBM, Yahoo! and EarthLink. In 2011, X1 Discovery, Inc. was formed to expand the X1 product line to include eDiscovery and social media products. In 2012, the full suite of X1 products was combined under X1.

X1's products include:

- Search
- Distributed Discovery
- Social Discovery
