= Breakthrough Software =

Software Company in Novato, California

- Industry: Software
- Founded: By 1984
- Defunct: 1987
- Fate: Merged into Symantec
- Headquarters: Novato, California, U.S.
- Products: Project management software
- Brands: Time Line, Timeline

Breakthrough Software was a software company based in Novato, California. Breakthrough developed and sold the Time Line project management software for PC DOS computers, releasing the first version in 1984, and version 2.0 in July, 1985. Company staff in the 1980s included William Lohse (1984-1985) as president, Victoria Lohse as COO and CEO and Andrew Layman as president starting in 1986.

Negotiations to merge Breakthrough into Integrated Software Systems Corp. (ISSCO) reached an agreement in principle in October, 1986 but broke down soon afterwards when Computer Associates, developer of a different project management program, announced an agreement to acquire ISSCO.

Breakthrough was acquired by Symantec in 1987. Symantec continued to release versions of Timeline until at least version 6.0 in 1994.
