= Symantec Online Backup =

Online remote backup service

- Developer: Symantec
- Initial release: Feb 2008
- Operating system: Windows Server 2003 Vista, XP, 2000
- Platform: Windows
- Available in: English
- Type: Online backup service
- License: Proprietary
- Website: www.spn.com

Symantec Online Backup is an online remote backup service that provides businesses with a system for backing up and storing computer files over the Internet. It was released in February, 2008 on the Symantec Protection Network platform.

Symantec entered the online backup market in 2008 by acquiring SwapDrive, a privately held online storage company, for $123 million. The acquisition strengthened Symantec's services offerings in the Norton consumer portfolio and helped consumers manage data across their devices.

Symantec Online Backup is an example of cloud computing or SaaS (software as a service).

In June 2008, Symantec also acquired Altiris, a provider of IT management solutions, to further enhance its online backup and storage offerings.

Sales for Symantec Online Backup was discontinued in January 2010.

== See also ==
- Symantec Backup Exec - on-premises backup and recovery software for small to medium enterprises
