= Dynamic multipathing =

In computer data storage technology field, dynamic multipathing (DMP) is a multipath I/O enhancement technique that balances input/output (I/O) across many available paths from the computer to the storage device to improve performance and availability. The name was introduced with Veritas Volume Manager software.

The DMP utility does not take any time to switch over, although the total time for failover is dependent on how long the underlying disk driver retries the command before giving up.
