= Veritas Technologies =

American data management company

Veritas Technologies LLC
- Type: Private
- Industry: Information Management
- Founded: 1983; 43 years ago (as Tolerant Systems); January 29, 2016; 10 years ago (as Veritas Technologies)
- Founders: Eli Alon; Dale Shipley
- Headquarters: Santa Clara, California, US
- Key people: Greg Hughes (CEO)
- Owner: Cohesity (2024–present); The Carlyle Group (2016–2024)
- Number of employees: 7,000 (2020)
- Website: veritas.com

Veritas Technologies LLC is an American international data management company headquartered in Santa Clara, California. The company has its origins in Tolerant Systems, founded in 1983 and later renamed Veritas Software. It specializes in storage management software including the first commercial journaling file system, VxFS, VxVM, VCS, the personal/small office backup software Backup Exec and the enterprise backup software, NetBackup. Veritas Record Now was an early CD recording software.

Before merging with Symantec (now known as Gen Digital) in 2004, Veritas was listed on the S&P 500 and the NASDAQ-100 under the VRTS ticker symbol.

In 2014, Symantec announced that it would demerge its information management business as Veritas Technologies LLC, to focus on security. It was purchased as part of the demerger by the private equity firm the Carlyle Group for $8 billion in cash in 2016. Its data protection and data security unit was sold in 2024 to software firm Cohesity, valued at $3 billion. Remaining part of Veritas Technologies later spun-off into an independent company called Arctera.

== History ==
=== Early history ===
The company was founded by Eli Alon and Dale Shipley (both from Intel) as Tolerant Systems in 1983 to build fault-tolerant computer systems based on the idea of "shoe box" building blocks. The shoe box consisted of an OS processor, running a version of Unix called TX, and on which applications ran, and an I/O processor, running a Real Time Executive, developed by Tolerant, called RTE: both processors were 320xx processors. The system was marketed as the "Eternity Series."

The TX software gained a level of fault-tolerance through check-pointing technology. Applications needed to be fortified with this check-pointing to allow roll-back of the application on another processor if a hardware failure occurred. Tolerant also developed a forerunner of today's RAID systems by incorporating a journaling file system and multiple copies of the disk drive content.

Logo as Veritas Software

Dale Shipley formed Tolerant Software in January 1988. Tolerant Software produced a journaling file system and a virtual disk management system for the AT&T UNIX platform, which was built by a new team led by John Carmichael.

The firm started out with a relationship with AT&T to provide the file (Veritas File System – VxFS) and disk management (Veritas Volume Manager – VxVM) software for its UNIX operating system, and to jointly market and support the products to the System OEMS (Sun, HP, etc.). The OEM model provided royalties to Veritas when the OEM shipped its products to end users.

On December 9, 1993, the company had its initial public offering (IPO), selling 16 million shares to the public, and valuing the company at $64 million.

=== Growth and acquisitions ===
At the end of 1996, Veritas had revenues of $36 million.

- Tidalwave Technologies Acquisition: In 1995 the company acquired Tidalwave Technologies, a small San Francisco–based company for $4.2 million in stock. Tidalwave specialized in cross-platform High Availability (HA) Software and thus entered the HA business.
- OpenVision Acquisition: In 1997 the company acquired OpenVision Technologies, another public company of the same size, and thus entered the backup business. Although the company only retained $20 million of OpenVision's 1996 base, it completed the 1997 year at $120 million. It was during this high growth period that the Veritas Board decided to consolidate the various business locations into a 550,000 sq ft facility in Mountain View, CA. Ernst & Young Consultants led by David Bentley as the project manager were brought in to lead this effort and soon hired HOK as the architect and Rudolf and Sletten as the general contractor. The new facility was completed in 2000.
- Seagate NSMG Acquisition: The company achieved $200 million in 1998, and in 1999 acquired the backup business from Seagate Software, which was also approximately $200 million in 1998. In 1999 the combined company achieved revenues of $700 million, and became the undisputed leader in the Storage Management Software industry. In 2000 the company achieved revenues of $1.2 billion, was added to the S&P 500, became a Fortune 1000 company, and became the tenth largest software company in the world by revenues, and third largest by market capitalization.
- Internet Bubble: In 2001 the industry went through a major downturn as the internet bubble burst. Nonetheless, the company was able to achieve revenue growth of 25% to $1.5 billion, and operating margins of 25%.
- Growth of 42X: Through this accelerated growth, Veritas went from a $36 million company to a $1.5 billion company, a growth multiple of 42X in five years.
- April 1997 – Acquired OpenVision Technologies. This included NetBackup.
- May 1999 – Acquired the Network and Storage Management Group of Seagate Software. This included Backup Exec.
- August 2003 – Acquired Israel's Precise Software Solutions, one of the Application Performance Management (APM) leaders, for about $400 million in cash and 7.4 million shares of its stock for a total of about $609 million.

=== 2004–2014: Merger with Symantec ===
In 1998, Veritas decided to consolidate most of its offices to one corporate headquarters in Mountain View and hired Ernst and Young to plan the new 550,000 sq ft facility. David Bentley of EY led the team to hire HOK as the architect and Rudolf and Sletten as the general contractor. The new facility was completed in 2001 along the new light rail facility. On December 16, 2004, Veritas and Symantec announced their plans for a merger in a deal valued at $13.5 billion. The deal created the fourth-largest software firm in the world to date. Veritas and Symantec's shareholders approved the merger on June 24, 2005, and it was completed on July 2.

=== 2014–2016: Demerger ===
On October 10, 2014, Symantec announced it planned to split the company into two parts. The security business would remain with Symantec, and the information management business would be known as Veritas Technologies Corporation. The separation of the companies was completed on January 29, 2016.

On August 11, 2015, Symantec announced the sale of its Veritas information management business to The Carlyle Group. Veritas and Symantec achieved operational separation on October 1, 2015. The sale completed on January 30, 2016, when Veritas became a privately held company. The sale to go private was for $8 billion, and represented a mark-down on Symantec stock.

=== 2016: The new beginning ===
After the demerger from Symantec in 2016, Veritas rebranded itself as Veritas Technologies LLC. with a new logo. As CEO, Bill Coleman was able to transform the company to have "a startup, win-in-the-marketplace, customer-first culture" during the two-year turnaround. On January 28, 2018, Veritas Technologies LLC. named Greg Hughes as its CEO. With a new brand and a new CEO, Veritas Technologies planned to move its employees to its new headquarters in Santa Clara by the end of summer 2018. In September 2020, Veritas Technologies LLC acquired Los Angeles–based software company Globanet.

=== 2024: Merger of data protection and data security unit with Cohesity ===
Cohesity acquired Veritas' data protection and data security unit (including Veritas Alta and NetBackup) in February 2024 for a deal valued at $7 billion, with Veritas being valued in the deal at $3 billion as per a Reuters report. The acquisition was completed in December 2024. There were some remaining parts of Veritas that Cohesity did not acquire, among them Backup Exec, data compliance, data governance, and InfoScale. These non-Cohesity businesses were separated into an independent company called Arctera, which continued ownership by The Carlyle Group, until Arctera's sale to Cloud Software Group in August 2025.

== Products and services ==
The following list includes products and services of Veritas Technologies before the Cohesity acquisition and the spin-off of Arctera.

- Veritas Alta
- Access
- VxFS and VxVM
- NetBackup
- NetBackup Appliances
- Backup Exec
- Cluster Server (VCS)
- Enterprise Vault
- Volume Replicator (VVR)
- SANPoint
- eDiscovery Platform
- APTARE IT Analytics
- CloudPoint
- SaaS Backup
- Desktop and Laptop Option
- Flex Appliance
- Information Studio
- Data Insight
- Veritas InfoScale, data management such as HyperScale for OpenStack
- Resiliency Platform
- Hubstor

=== Drive Letter Access ===
Drive Letter Access (DLA) is a discontinued commercial packet writing application for the Microsoft Windows operating system that allows optical disc data storage devices to be used in a manner similar to floppy disks. DLA is a packet writing technology for CD and DVD media that uses the UDF file system.

DLA is not compatible with Windows Vista and newer, although a patch exists to fix this issue under Windows Vista.

Roxio Burn was introduced on April 30, 2009. As a replacement for DLA, it remedies compatibility issues Internet Explorer 8.

DLA was originally developed by VERITAS Software and later sold to Sonic Solutions in 2002. It was common as it was shipped with a majority of CD and DVD recording drives, where DLA came as a custom OEM version for the branded drive. Also, most PC systems from Dell, HP, IBM, Sony and Toshiba came with DLA pre-installed. An OEM version was often available for download for the specific computer system.

With Windows Vista support for DLA was either dropped or it was replaced by a similar product, like Drag-to-Disc.

== Lawsuits ==
In 1999, VERITAS Software Corp. (VERITAS US) and VERITAS Ireland entered into a cost-sharing agreement (CSA) which was the subject of litigation with the U.S. Internal Revenue Service.

== See also ==
- Veritas Storage Foundation
- Veritas Cluster File System
- Veritas File System
- Enterprise Vault
- Veritas Services and Operations Readiness Tools (SORT)
