= Synex International =

Synex International Inc. (TSX: SXI) is a Vancouver, Canada, based company that has traded on the Toronto Stock Exchange since 1987. It is made up of two wholly owned subsidiary companies: Synex Energy Resources Ltd. (the Energy Division) and Sigma Engineering Ltd. (the Engineering Division).

== Operational projects ==
Mears creek (4MW, 20GWh/yr)
BC Hydro awarded this project a 20-year Power Purchase Agreement in 2001. Construction began in June 2003 and the project was commissioned in January 2004. In its 2004 Annual Report, Synex listed the project’s capital cost as $6.6m.

Cypress creek (3MW)
BC Hydro originally awarded this project a Power Purchase Agreement in 2003. However, it did not become operational until July 2009, when it became the first project to take advantage of BC Hydro’s Standing Offer Program. Additionally, revenues are supplemented by the Government of Canada's $10/MWh ecoENERGY subsidy.

Barr creek hydro (4MW, 15GWh/yr)

This project was awarded a Power Purchase Agreement in BC Hydro's 2006 Open Call for Power and later qualified for the $10/MWh ecoENERGY grant. Construction began on the access roads to the project site in May 2010 and the project is expected to be operational in November 2011. In October 2010, Synex announced that it owns 90% of Barr Creek LP and the remaining 10% is owned by the Ehattshat First Nation, which has the option to purchase an additional 10% from Synex before Jan 2011.

== Development projects ==
McKelvie creek hydro (3.4MW, 14GWh/yr)

Originally, the McKelvie Creek project was awarded a PPA in the 2006 Open Call for Power. Development was stalled in July 2007, as due higher than anticipated costs required for interconnection with the grid pushed capital costs up from $10m to $15m. Synex later revealed that it was expecting to receive a new PPA for this project via BC Hydro’s Standing Offer Program. However, BC Hydro has barred projects that received PPAs in the 2006 and 2008 Call processes from participating in the Standing Offer Program.

Victoria lake hydro (9.5MW, 39GWh/yr)

This was one of three PPAs awarded to Synex in the 2006 Open Call for Power (the firm bid four projects in total). Located near Port Alice, this project has an estimated capital cost of $18m. In its Q3 2009 report, Synex stated that regulatory work was progressing on this project. However, the firm has not mentioned any further developments since that time.

== See also ==
- List of companies of Canada
- Companies listed on the Toronto Stock Exchange (S)
- Synex Systems Corporation
