= Cohesity =

American developer of data management software

Cohesity, Inc.
- Type: Private
- Industry: Information technology Data security Disaster recovery Data management
- Founded: June 2013
- Founder: Mohit Aron
- Headquarters: Santa Clara, California, United States
- Key people: Sanjay Poonen (CEO and President)
- Products: DataProtect; SmartFiles; Helios; FortKnox; DataHawk
- Revenue: ▲$1.7 Billion (2025)
- Number of employees: 6,000
- Website: www.cohesity.com

Cohesity, Inc. is an American privately held information technology company headquartered in Santa Clara, California, with offices in India and Ireland. The company develops software that allows IT professionals to backup, manage and gain insights from their data across multiple systems or cloud providers. Their products also include anti-ransomware features, Disaster Recovery-as-a-Service, and SaaS management.

== History ==
Cohesity was founded in June 2013 by Mohit Aron. Aron previously co-founded storage company Nutanix. While still in stealth mode, it closed a Series A funding round of $15M.

The company launched publicly in June 2015, introducing a platform designed to consolidate and manage secondary data. In October, Cohesity announced the public launch of its data management products, DataPlatform and DataProtect. As part of coming out of stealth mode, the company announced a Series B funding round of $55M, bringing its total at that point to $70M.

In February 2016, the company announced the second generation of DataPlatform and DataProtect. In June, the company launched its 3.0 products, expanding data protection to physical servers. Also by June, the company had raised $70 million in venture funding in two rounds with Google Ventures, Qualcomm Ventures, and Sequoia Capital.

On April 4, 2017, Cohesity announced a $90 million Series C funding round, led by GV, the venture capital arm of Google parent Alphabet Inc., and Sequoia Capital. In November 2017, Cohesity had 300 employees.

On June 11, 2018, the company announced a Series D funding round of $250 million led by SoftBank Vision Fund. In August, the company introduced a SaaS-based management console called Helios.

In February 2019, Cohesity launched their online MarketPlace to sell applications that run on its DataPlatform. In May, the company made its first acquisition by buying Imanis Data, a provider of NoSQL data protection software. In July, the company announced it would be recognizing revenue predominantly from software, transitioning away from recognizing hardware revenue from the sale of backup appliances.

In 2020, Cohesity raised $250 million in an E-round of funding. By December 2021, the company had raised a total of $660 million.

Cohesity filed for an IPO in December 2021.

In April 2022, Cohesity partnered with Rackspace Technology. Using Cohesity DataProtect as its foundation, Rackspace Technology is a multi-cloud managed backup and recovery software.

In August 2022, the company announced that Sanjay Poonen would replace Mohit Aron as CEO and President of Cohesity.

In December 2024, Cohesity completed its acquisition of data management company Veritas Technologies from The Carlyle Group for $3 billion.

== Products ==
Cohesity develops software used to consolidate and simplify data management, and includes analytics capabilities. The company's software also solves the problem of mass data fragmentation, as data proliferates across multiple systems or cloud providers. Their software also focuses on data security, backing up corporate data.

=== DataPlatform ===
The company's main product, DataPlatform, is hyper converged software that allows businesses to consolidate a variety of workloads, including backups, archives, test and development, along with analytics data, onto a single cloud-native platform. It works with physical servers as well as virtual machines.

The company also develops data management and backup software called DataProtect, which runs on DataPlatform. As of 2019, the most current version was code-named Pegasus. Pegusus v6.3 provides anti-ransomware features including machine learning-based anomaly detection.

Through the acquisition of Imanis Data in 2019, Cohesity extended backup capabilities to NoSQL workloads distributed databases like MongoDB, Cassandra, Couchbase, and Hbase, as well as Hadoop data on Hadoop distributed file system (HDFS) datastores.

The company's Helios SaaS management tool provides a dashboard view of a customer's DataPlatform sites, including local and remote; on-premises; and in the public cloud. The AI-powered Helios platform is used by companies such as Palo Alto Networks. Many of the products in the Helios suite help companies after data loss events.

The company's MarketPlace allows customers to purchase the company's other applications, as well as third party apps that run on the company's DataPlatform. The company also makes a software development kit (SDK) available for programmers who want to develop their own apps for DataPlatform.

=== Disaster Recovery as-a-Service ===
In 2019, Cohesity announced its Disaster Recovery-as-a-Service offering, which allows customers to use Amazon Web Services (AWS) as a recovery location in the event of a disaster. In October 2020, DataProtect SaaS was available on AWS cloud.

Cohesity's Security Advisor application scans for malware entry holes. SiteContinuity, a disaster recovery service, was announced in 2021, along with DataGovern, a data security and governance service.

In May 2022, the company released Cohesity FortKnox. It protects user data against ransomware or other cyber attacks using an air-gapped digital vault within AWS that is managed by Cohesity.

In June 2022, DataProtect and FortKnox became available to customers in Southeast Asia.
