= Visual Café =

Software development environment

Visual Café (formally Visual Café for Java) is a discontinued integrated development environment for the Java programming language. It included a GUI builder and was marketed as a series of editions: "Standard Edition," "Enterprise Suite," "Expert Edition," "Professional Edition," and "Development Edition." The "Enterprise Suite" was notable for supporting distributed CORBA and RMI debugging. Visual Cafe itself was not written in Java.

Visual Café was spun off by Symantec, being purchased by BEA Systems and sold as the development environment to an early WebLogic Server. The freeware tools environment (Eclipse) limited the commercial viability of the development tool market, and Visual Cafe' became the flagship product of a new BEA spinoff company focused on development tools called WebGain. WebGain acquired several other technologies, including TopLink, before ceasing operations in 2002. While TopLink found a home at Oracle, Visual Café is no longer commercially available.

WebGain purchased TogetherSoft's product Together Control Center (Together Studio) to integrate into Visual Café, but soon after the purchase was complete, Borland purchased WebGain's products Visual Café and Together Control Center. These products can now be found in JBuilder.

Mansour Safai, Vice President of the Language and Internet Tools Division of Symantec recognized the significance of the Java language early on, and was the first to offer integrated Java development tools in the pioneering Café product line, which evolved to the market leading product Visual Café. Visual Café was considered an early leader in Java IDE's.

The product was well received. It won InfoWorld's 1997 "Product of the Year" award.

== Competing IDEs ==
Other IDEs that existed at the same time were Visual Age for Java (the spiritual predecessor to Eclipse), Asymetrix' SuperCede (the first Java machine code compiler), NetBeans (known briefly as Forté for Java), JBuilder, PowerSoft's PowerJ and Mojo Enterprise.
