= Amber Road, Inc. =

American software company

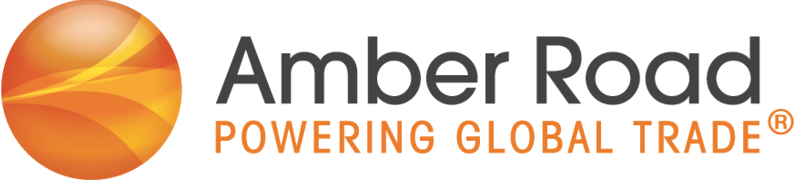
- Type: Public company
- Traded as: NYSE: AMBR
- Industry: Enterprise software
- Founded: 1990; 36 years ago
- Founder: James Preuninger (CEO)
- Headquarters: East Rutherford, New Jersey, United States
- Revenue: ▲$85.2 million (2018)

Amber Road, Inc. was a US-based software company specializing in Global Trade Management (GTM) solutions. It was acquired by E2open in 2019.

Amber Road was headquartered in East Rutherford, New Jersey, with its European headquarters in Munich, Germany. The company had offices in Tysons Corner, Virginia, and Raleigh, North Carolina, in the United States, Hong Kong, Shanghai and Shenzhen (China), as well as in Bangalore, India.

== History ==
The company was founded in 1990 by James and John Preuninger under the name of Management Dynamics in the USA. In 2011, the company was renamed Amber Road.

Its Europe, the Middle East and Africa headquarters was opened in Munich during 2013 and the company was listed on the New York Stock Exchange in 2014.

The company acquired the following: Bridgepoint (2005), NextLinx (2005), EasyCargo (2013), Global Trade Academy (2015) and ecVision (2015).

Amber Road was acquired by E2open for $425 million in 2019.

== Product ==
Amber Road developed and programs Global Trade Management solutions, which are offered as Software as a Service.

The task of Global Trade Management software is to ensure transparency and automation in foreign trade and supply chain management.

== See also ==
- International trade
- Supply chain management
- Software as a service
