= Synex Systems Corporation =

Software company in Canada

- Type: independent
- Industry: software
- Founded: 1983
- Headquarters: Vancouver, British Columbia
- Key people: Murray Hendren
- Subsidiaries: Synex International Inc.

Synex Systems Corporation, a subsidiary of Synex International Inc. (Symbol SXI, TSX), was formed in 1983 in an effort to develop software for the microcomputer market and was run by Synex International Vice President Murray Hendren until 1992. In 2002, Synex Systems was acquired by privately owned Lasata Software of Perth, Australia. In 2005, Lasata was acquired by UK based Systems Union. In 2007, Systems Union was acquired by privately held Infor Global Solutions, a U.S. company that specializes in enterprise software.

What was Synex Systems Corporation now operates as an independent business unit within Infor Global Solutions called F9 and continues to develop and partner with new and existing ERP and Accounting Software solutions. It is located in Vancouver, British Columbia.

== Products ==
Synex Systems products were diverse and targeted accounting, civil engineering, minicomputer thin client, and file compression utility markets. By 2001 the concentration was only on the accounting reporting product F9 and all other products were discontinued or sold.

=== PK Harmony ===
PK Harmony was Synex System's first software offering. It is a terminal emulation package that would now be termed a thin client.

PK Harmony provides an interface from a PC to a Pick host by emulating a terminal. Connectivity is achieved by serial port-to-port cabling or a modem.

PK Harmony allows users to transfer data to and from a Pick operating system legacy host and a DOS or Windows based PC. Development started in 1983.

PK Harmony was purchased by Pierre Bourbonnais, a former senior Synex marketing team member, and is now marketed as PK Harmony - PK Term Plus through TechnoDroids CyberCorp.

Original 5.25 floppy disk of a PK Harmony PK Print Module

=== F9 ===
F9 Financial Reporting was developed starting in 1986 to allow a non-technical user, typically an accountant, to create a dynamic, customized general ledger financial report using a spreadsheet that is 'hot-linked' to an accounting system's general ledger

This product is still being used, updated, and is one of the longest lasting the products developed by Synex Systems.

F9 software box with promotional pen

=== SQZ! ===
In the late 1980s microcomputer (PC) use in offices was ubiquitous and the most used program was the spreadsheet. Hard drive space was limited and expensive and many businesses found the plethora of spreadsheets they came to rely upon exceeded the space on the drives. SQZ was the first automatic file compression utility when it was introduced as Symantec's second product offering in the mid-1980s through its Turner Hall Publishing division, the first being Note-It, a notation utility for Lotus 1-2-3. SQZ! initially sold for US$79.95 and was a major part of Symantec's early success and helped form the basis of the 1990s acquisitions Symantec grew from. Several people working at Synex involved with SQZ! were hired by Symantec as a result of this success.

SQZ! is a compression utility specifically designed to compress spreadsheet files and was marketed starting 1986. Sqz! is available as an add-in for 1-2-3 Release 2/2.01, and as a terminate-and-stay-resident (TSR) utility for any version of 1-2-3, Symphony or any other programs that read or write 1-2-3 R2 format worksheets.

In 1988 an improved version, SQZ! Plus, was released. This was available as an upgrade priced at US$30. SQZ! was best at compressing complex business spreadsheets and could achieve compressions of between 78% and 90% on large business-analysis worksheets compared to 60% to 65% for competitors like The Worksheet Utilities 123 add-in Fileworks (Funk Software).

At one time in the early 1990s SQZ! was one of the most used utility software programs in the world.

SQZ! was also incorporated into Quattro Pro as a built-in utility. A Macintosh version of SQZ! called Mac SQZ! was available for Microsoft Excel.

The primary architect of SQZ! was Dale White, who developed the highly efficient spreadsheet formula-specific compression algorithms. He also developed a sophisticated corrupt spreadsheet recovery system that was built into SQZ! Plus. SQZ! Plus was released in 1988 as a replacement for Sqz! Version 1.5.

With the huge leaps in hard drive capacity and lower costs for these ever larger drives, and the building of compression into late versions of DOS and Windows, the need for SQZ! and other file compression utilities disappeared and the SQZ! product was discontinued by the mid 1990s.

=== WaterWorks Analysis Program ===
Synex's Waterworks is a water distribution network analyzer based on F9 computer spreadsheet add-in technology. Waterworks enhances municipal water distribution design by combining both graphical and numerical results in a single interface and allows data exchange with CAD packages.

Waterworks core functionality was a Fortran coded algorithm developed at the University of British Columbia school of engineering. Much of the parent company Synex International Inc. was concerned with civil engineering and specialized in small hydroelectric projects and a synergy developed between the software and engineering divisions.

Waterworks saw some success being used by various water districts across the United States for water distribution analysis including the Greater Los Angeles Water District.

=== @trieve ===
@trieve (pronounced at-reev) was a Synex Systems product developed in 1991 from the F9 project code. It was at first written and used as an internal utility that allowed easy examination of Btrieve database file contents and helped in designing new Btrieve based accounting package interfaces for F9. @trieve allowed the user to read and write the contents of Btrieve files to and from a spreadsheet. Many accounting products marketed at the time used Btrieve as the underlying database engine and developing an F9 interface to these accounting products required highly detailed access to the data structures which easy examination of the data greatly aided.

Because Btrieve is not a true database in that it does not contain a definition of the data being stored @trieve used a data dictionary that was defined in a spreadsheet to determine the structure of the data records.

Although limited in user appeal, @trieve was a useful utility for experts that required detailed access to Btrieve-based data. A Great Plains Accounting edition of @trieve was developed and marketed by Great Plains which was later purchased by Microsoft and became Microsoft Dynamics GP.

== See also ==
- List of companies of Canada
- Companies listed on the Toronto Stock Exchange (S)
- List of ERP software packages
- Synex International
