= F9 Financial Reporting =

- Developer: F9, an Infor company
- Written in: C/C++, C#
- Operating system: Microsoft Windows
- Type: Reporting software
- Website: F9 Financial Reporting

F9 is a financial reporting software application that dynamically links general ledger data to Microsoft Excel through the use of financial cell-based formulas, wizards, and analysis tools to create spreadsheet reports that can be calculated, filtered, and drilled upon. The F9 software is developed, marketed, and support by an organization also called F9, a division of Infor Global Solutions (Canada) Ltd. which is headquartered in Vancouver.

== History ==
F9 - The Financial Reporter was originally developed by Synex Systems Corporation, a subsidiary of Synex International (Symbol SXI, TSX). First announced in 1988 as Acclink for Accpac as a Lotus 1-2-3 add-in for MS-DOS and released under F9 name later in 1989. Subsequently F9 was developed for Microsoft Excel.

F9 Shipping Box and Promotional Pen

F9 was developed to allow a non-technical user, typically an accountant, to create a dynamic, customized general ledger financial report using a spreadsheet that is 'hot-linked' to an accounting system's general ledger.

Initially, the user interface used the same syntax as Accpac for specifying the reporting period. This was soon replaced by a simpler to understand and more flexible generic natural language interface that used a temporal trinary (three part) phrase parsing syntax composed of a modifier, a period specifier, and a temporal index. For example: "starting balance last quarter" is broken down to 'starting balance' (modifier) + 'last' (temporal index) + 'quarter' (period). The temporal index can be relative or absolute and the modifier can determine if the value returned is differential or cumulative.

An F9 addin was developed for Excel in 1989 and with the lack of a 1-2-3 version that supported Windows and problems with the Lotus Programming Language (LPL) the Excel version of F9 soon far outsold the 1-2-3 version.

On or about the year 2002 F9 was renamed 'F9 - Financial Intelligence.'

In 2002, Synex Systems was acquired by privately owned Lasata Software of Perth, Australia. In 2005, Lasata was acquired by UK based Systems Union. In 2007, Systems Union was acquired by privately held Infor Global Solutions, a U.S. company that specializes in enterprise software.

What was Synex Systems Corporation now operates as an independent business unit (IBU) within Infor Global Solutions called F9.

As of 2012 F9 was used by over 30,000 financial accounting professionals in more than 20 countries worldwide and was named one of Accounting Today's "Top 100 Software Products" for 2001.

== Features ==
- Financial Spreadsheet Formulas
- Use of natural language (English) accounting period specifiers
- Dynamic Report Filters
- Report Wizards
- Table and Pivot Table Reporting
- Drilldown to Transactions
- Budget Reporting and Budget Write Back
- Consolidations
- Report Analysis
- Web reporting and dashboards
- Over 150 different accounting/ERP systems are supported.

== Competition ==
The major competitor of F9 is Microsoft's FRx. However starting in 2011 FRx is now in a state of phased discontinuation. and Microsoft's official FRx replacement is Management Reporter. Other reporting systems competing with F9 are Alchemex, Bizinsight, Renovofyi and SmartView by Solution 7.

== See also ==
- List of companies of Canada
- List of ERP software packages
- CYMA (software)
