= PC Tools (company) =

Australian software company

- Type: Subsidiary
- Founded: February 25, 2003; 23 years ago
- Defunct: December 4, 2013
- Headquarters: Sydney, Australia
- Number of locations: Luxembourg; United States; United Kingdom; Ukraine; Ireland
- Area served: Worldwide
- Key people: Dave Cole (Vice President and General Manager)
- Number of employees: 200+
- Parent: Symantec
- Website: www.pctools.com

PC Tools (formerly known as WinGuides) was a software company founded in 2003 and acquired by Symantec in 2008; the new owner eventually discontinued the PC Tools name. Company headquarters were in Australia, with offices in Luxembourg, the United States, United Kingdom, Ireland, and Ukraine. The company had previously developed and distributed security and optimization software for the Mac OS X and Microsoft Windows platforms.

== Products ==
By 29 November 2006 software owned by PC Tools had been downloaded over 125 million times.

Products
Name	Version	Last Release Date	Notes
Browser Defender	3.0.0.312	12 May 2011	
PC Tools Antivirus	9	Unavailable	
PC Tools Desktop Maestro	3.1.0.232	16 November 2009	
PC Tools File Recover	9	31 October 2011	
PC Tools iAntiVirus	1.36	28 August 2009	
PC Tools Internet Security	9	Unavailable	
PC Tools Performance Toolkit	2	31 October 2011	
PC Tools Privacy Guardian	4.5	Unavailable	
PC Tools Registry Mechanic	11	31 October 2011	
PC Tools Simple Backup	3	Unavailable	
PC Tools Spyware Doctor	9	Unavailable	
PC Tools Spyware Doctor with AntiVirus	9	Unavailable	

Miscellaneous Products
Name	Notes
PC Tools Browser Explorer	
Startup Explorer	
ThreatExpert	

=== PC Tools Browser Defender ===
PC Tools Browser Defender, also called Browser Defender for short, is a browser toolbar for Internet Explorer and Mozilla Firefox browsers on Windows based computers. Browser Defender allows for safe web surfing.

=== PC Tools iAntiVirus ===
iAntivirus was updated in 2012 and rebranded under Symantec's Norton brand.

PC Tools iAntiVirus is free antivirus software for Intel based Apple Macintosh computers running Mac OS 10.5 (Leopard) and Mac OS 10.6 (Snow Leopard) initially released in June 2008, used to detect and remove malware, spyware and malicious exploits, using both signature-based and heuristic detection.

AntiVirus was criticized because it only scans for Macintosh viruses, ignoring Windows and Linux viruses. It was praised for its speed and low usage of system resources.

=== PC Tools Internet Security ===
PC Tools Internet Security, was the combination of the Spyware Doctor product the Firewall product and the Anti-Spam product. It provided the functionality of all three stand lone products into a single seamless product. Symantec is no longer offering this product as of 18 May 2013. It was payware designed for Windows 8 (32-/64-bit), Windows 7 (32-/64-bit), Windows Vista (32-/64-bit) and Windows XP (32-bit).

=== PC Tools Registry Mechanic ===
PC Tools Registry Mechanic, the first software PC Tools released, scanned the Windows registry to find errors. Version 11, released on 31 October 2011, is the last one.

=== PC Tools Spyware Doctor ===
Screenshot of PC Tools Spyware Doctor

PC Tools Spyware Doctor, is anti-malware software. Spyware Doctor detects malware based on indicators of compromise using its spider technology. The most recent version of Spyware Doctor is 9, which was released on 31 October 2011. Symantec is no longer offering this product as of 18 May 2013.

Former employees noticed an increasing number of malware, spyware and other threats targeting macOS and Apple devices. As of 2019, Spyware Doctor has been remade on macOS and included as part of the iBoostUp with Spyware Doctor Mac application suite. Spyware Doctor for Mac has been tested and certified OPSWAT Platinum.

==== PC Tools Spyware Doctor with AntiVirus ====
PC Tools Spyware Doctor with AntiVirus has the same features as Spyware Doctor, with added anti-virus capabilities. Symantec has not sold this since 2013; v9 is the last one available.

=== ThreatExpert ===
The ThreatExpert Web site says that it is an advanced automated threat analysis system (initialized ATAS) built to analyze and report the actions of malware in a fully automated mode. As of March 2015 the latest version was beta version 1.0.1.0 of 1 March 2008. There have been no updates since March 2008, and the Web site seems inactive.

== Acquisition by Symantec ==
On 18 August 2008, Symantec announced the signing of an agreement to acquire PC Tools such that PC Tools would maintain separate operations. The financial terms of the acquisition were not disclosed. Symantec acquired PC Tools for US$262,000,000 on 6 October 2008.

Symantec withdrew the entire PC Tools security portfolio, comprising PC Tools Internet Security, Spyware Doctor and Spyware Doctor with Antivirus, on 18 May 2013; PC Tools was not sold and could not be renewed from 4 December 2013. Symantec said that this would not affect PC Tools Utilities products.

== Reception ==
Spyware Doctor received the PC World Best Buy award in the October 2007 issue of the magazine saying "PC Tools' Spyware Doctor 5.0 was the winner, outperforming the competition at detecting and removing our test set of adware and spyware samples."

Spyware Doctor has received several Editors' Choice awards from PC Magazine, including one for Spyware Doctor with AntiVirus 5.5 in 2008. The product has also received numerous other awards from around the globe.

Not all reviews have been positive and early versions of Spyware Doctor 5.0, which the company rewrote from scratch, received some negative commentary.

== Criticism ==
Symantec was unsuccessfully sued by a Washington resident for running fake scans to get people to pay for subscriptions to PC Tools's Registry Mechanic, Performance Toolkit, and Norton Utilities The lawsuit claims the company intentionally ran the fake scans and the results were not real.
