= Veritas Cluster File System =

File system

The Veritas Cluster File System (or VxCFS) is a cache coherent POSIX compliant shared file system built based upon VERITAS File System. It is distributed with a built-in Cluster Volume Manager (VxCVM) and components of other VERITAS Storage Foundation products - particularly VERITAS Cluster Server, VERITAS File System, and VERITAS Volume Manager. It uses the underlying mechanisms of VERITAS Cluster Server to manage membership and changes in cluster state.

The shared file system is available on the following operating systems: IBM AIX, Solaris, Linux, and HP-UX. The current version of the product is version 7.4.1.

== Mode of clustering ==
Because of the need to maintain cluster awareness to prevent any data corruption or discrepancies in cache, the clusters are tightly coupled and communicate over Ethernet.

== See also ==
- Veritas File System
- Veritas Volume Manager
- Veritas Cluster Server
- Symantec Operations Readiness Tools (SORT)
