= E2open =

Software company

E2open Parent Holdings, Inc.
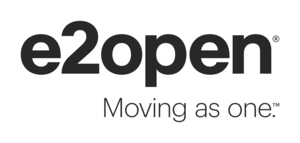
- Type: Public
- Traded as: NYSE: ETWO
- Industry: Enterprise Software; Supply Chain Management
- Founded: 2000; 26 years ago
- Headquarters: Addison, Texas, United States
- Area served: United States; Germany; United Kingdom; Denmark; China; France; Malaysia; India; Singapore; Australia
- Key people: Mark Hall (CEO)
- Parent: WiseTech Global
- Website: www.e2open.com

E2open Parent Holdings, Inc. was founded as a business-to-business provider of cloud-based, on-demand software for supply chains for computer, telecom and electronics systems, components and services. The company was founded in 2000 as a joint project of 8 major companies: Hitachi, IBM, LG Electronics, Matsushita, Nortel, Seagate, Solectron, and Toshiba.

Today, e2open offers its products across a variety of industries, including high technology, industrial manufacturing, telecommunications, life sciences, oil and gas, consumer electronics, aerospace and defense, food and beverage, and consumer goods.

== Company ==
e2open is headquartered in Addison, Texas, with offices in Parsippany, New Jersey, Atlanta, Germany, the United Kingdom, Denmark, the Netherlands, Belgium, China, Australia, New Zealand, Malaysia, India and Peru.

According to the company's estimate, more than 60,000 trading partners and 200,000 unique registered users currently participate in the e2open Business Network.

In March 2015, three years after e2open went public on Nasdaq, Insight Venture Partners announced that it had completed the acquisition of the company. In February 2021, e2open went public via SPAC merger and began trading under the ticker ETWO.

In May 2025, WiseTech Global announced it had entered into an agreement to acquire e2open for $3.30 per share in cash equating to an enterprise value of USD$2.1 billion. This transaction was completed three months later.

=== Major acquisitions ===
- July 2013: acquired supply chain vendor ICON-SCM.
- June 2014: acquisition of SERUS Corporation, a "cloud-based manufacturing and product management provider".
- March 2016: acquisition of Terra Technology.
- June 2016: acquired Orchestro.
- February 2017: acquired Steelwedge.
- Late 2017: acquired Channel Data Management provider Zyme.
- Early 2018: acquired Entomo and Birch Worldwide.
- October 2018: bought the shipping platform INTTRA.
- October 2018: bought Cloud Logistics.
- July 2, 2019: e2open completes acquisition of global trade management software company Amber Road.
- May 2021: acquired logistics execution platform BluJay Solutions for $1.7B.

== See also ==
- Electronic commerce
- Enterprise application integration
