= Certisign =

Certisign Certificadora Digital, S.A.
- Company type: Private
- Industry: Trust Services Provider
- Founded: 1996
- Headquarters: São Paulo, SP, Brazil
- Key people: Roni Franco, COO
- Revenue: R$ 330 milhões (2021)
- Number of employees: 320 (2022)
- Website: www.Certisign.com.br

Certisign Certificadora Digital S.A. is a Brazilian company based in São Paulo that provides public key infrastructure (PKI) products to financial institutions, governments, and enterprises. Certisign also provides a variety of security and consulting services ranging from digital certificates, authentication, and managed Digital Identity.

== History ==
In 1995, two Brazilian information technology professionals, Paulo Wollny and Eduardo Rosemberg, founded the company. In 1996, the company established itself as a certificate authority after it received an investment. In 2000 Certisign became the exclusive Brazilian affiliate of VeriSign.

In 2004, Certisign acquired KMS Software, an identity management provider. As at 2009 Certisign had about 1,500,000 certificates in operation, making it the largest CA in Brazil at that time.
