= AVG AntiVirus =

Antivirus computer program

- Developer: Gen Digital Inc.
- Operating system: Windows 7 and later, macOS, Android
- Type: Antivirus software
- License: Freemium
- Website: avg.com

AVG AntiVirus (previously known as AVG, an abbreviation of Anti-Virus Guard) is a line of antivirus software developed by AVG Technologies, a subsidiary of Avast, a part of Gen Digital. It is available for Windows, macOS and Android.

== History ==
The brand AVG comes from Grisoft's first product, Anti-Virus Guard, launched in 1992 in the Czech Republic. In 1997, the first AVG licenses were sold in Germany and the UK. AVG was introduced in the US in 1998.

The AVG Free Edition helped raise awareness of the AVG product line. In 2006, the AVG security package grew to include anti-spyware as AVG Technologies acquired ewido Networks, an anti-spyware group. AVG Technologies acquired Exploit Prevention Labs (XPL) in December 2007 and incorporated that company's LinkScanner safe search and surf technology into the AVG 8.0 security product range released in March 2008. In January 2009, AVG Technologies acquired Sana Security, a developer of identity theft prevention software. This software was incorporated into the AVG security product range in March 2009.

According to AVG Technologies, the company has more than 200 million active users worldwide, including more than 100 million who use their products and services on mobile devices.

On 7 July 2016, Avast announced an agreement to acquire AVG for $1.3 billion.

== Platform support ==
AVG provides AVG AntiVirus Free for Windows, AVG AntiVirus for Mac for macOS and AVG AntiVirus for Android for Android devices. All are freemium products: They are free to download, install, update and use, but for technical support a premium plan must be purchased.

AVG stopped providing new features for Windows XP and Windows Vista in January 2019. New versions require Windows 7 or later; virus definitions are still provided for previous versions. AVG stopped providing new features for Windows 7, Windows 8 and Windows 8.1 in January 2026. New versions require Windows 10 or later; virus definitions are still provided for previous versions.

== Features ==
AVG features most of the common functions available in modern antivirus and Internet security programs, including periodic scans, scans of sent and received emails (including adding footers to the emails indicating this), the ability to repair some virus-infected files, and a quarantine area (virus vault) in which infected files are held.

=== LinkScanner ===
The LinkScanner technology acquired from Exploit Prevention Labs and built into most AVG products, provides real-time updated protection against exploits and drive-by downloads. LinkScanner includes: Search-Shield – a safe search component that places safety ratings next to each link in Google, Yahoo! and MSN search results; plus Active Surf-Shield – a safe surf component that scans the contents of a web site in real-time to ensure it's safe being opened. Concerns regarding web analytics have made LinkScanner a controversial component (see "LinkScanner concerns" below).

==== LinkScanner concerns ====
When AVG 8.0 was first released, its LinkScanner safe search feature was shown to cause an increase in traffic on websites that appear high in search engine results pages. Since LinkScanner disguises the scans as coming from an Internet Explorer 6 browser when it prescans each site listed in the search results, website usage logs showed incorrect and overinflated site visitor statistics. The prescanning of every link in search results also caused websites to transfer more data than usual, resulting in higher bandwidth usage for web site operators and slow performance for users. AVG initially said that site administrators would be able to filter the LinkScanner traffic out of their site statistics, leaving the problem of excess bandwidth usage still to be solved. Pay-per-click advertising was not affected by the increase in traffic.

=== AVG Online Shield ===
AVG Online Shield is a feature designed to check files and ensure that they are safe. AVG Online Shield also ensures the safety of exchanging files via instant messengers and VoIP clients.

In response to complaints, AVG announced that as of 9 July 2008 "Search-Shield will no longer scan each search result online for new exploits, which was causing the spikes that webmasters addressed with us", releasing a new build on that date that applies a local blacklist, then prefetches and scans only those links clicked on by the user.

== Controversy ==
As of 2014, there are numerous reports dating back to 2012 that the AVG SafeGuard Toolbar installs itself without the consent of the user, as a side effect of installing other applications. The toolbar program appears to cause significant RAM issues and can be considered an intrusive potentially unwanted program (PUP). Once installed, the AVG toolbar is virtually impossible to remove. The toolbar uninstaller does not function, instead re-installing the add-on if manually removed. Consequently, many discussions and blog posts have described complex procedures for removal of the AVG toolbar, each with very mixed results.

In September 2015, AVG announced that it would start tracking users for profit, analyzing their data for sale to the advertising industry. This measure received criticism from consumers, the press and security industry, as many users intended to use the software in order to protect themselves from spyware and would not expect the functions of spyware to be "hidden" in security software. The updated privacy policy allowed AVG to collect browsing and search history, among other data, and to sell aggregated or de-identified data to third parties.

In December 2015, the AVG Web TuneUp Google Chrome extension (automatically installed with AVG AntiVirus) was revealed to contain multiple critical security vulnerabilities. Most notably, Chrome users' browsing history could be exposed to any website, cookies from any site the user has visited could be read by an attacker, and trivial cross-site scripting (XSS) issues could allow any website to execute arbitrary code (as another domain). The XSS vulnerability allowed a user's mail from "mail.google.com" to be read by any website, or financial information to be read from the user's online banking site. The AVG team fixed this by only allowing "mysearch.avg.com" and "webtuneup.avg.com" to execute these scripts. Despite this remediation, attackers could leverage any of these attacks if an XSS vulnerability was found on the AVG sites. As of April 2016, Web TuneUp was still not available for download from the AVG website.

In July 2016, AVG was acquired by Avast. Privacy concerns continued after the acquisition. In December 2019, Mozilla removed the AVG Online Security browser extension from the Firefox Add-ons repository after security researcher Wladimir Palant found that the extension was collecting detailed browsing data and sending it to Avast/AVG servers, contrary to its disclosed privacy policy.

In January 2020, a joint investigation by Motherboard and PCMag reported that Avast was collecting user web browsing data from its free antivirus products, including AVG AntiVirus, and selling it to third parties through its subsidiary Jumpshot. The data included Google searches, YouTube visits, and browsing histories, and could sometimes be linked to individual users. Avast stated that the data was de-identified, but subsequently announced that it would wind down Jumpshot and stop selling browsing data.

== See also ==
- Internet Security
