= Vincent Pilette =

American businessman

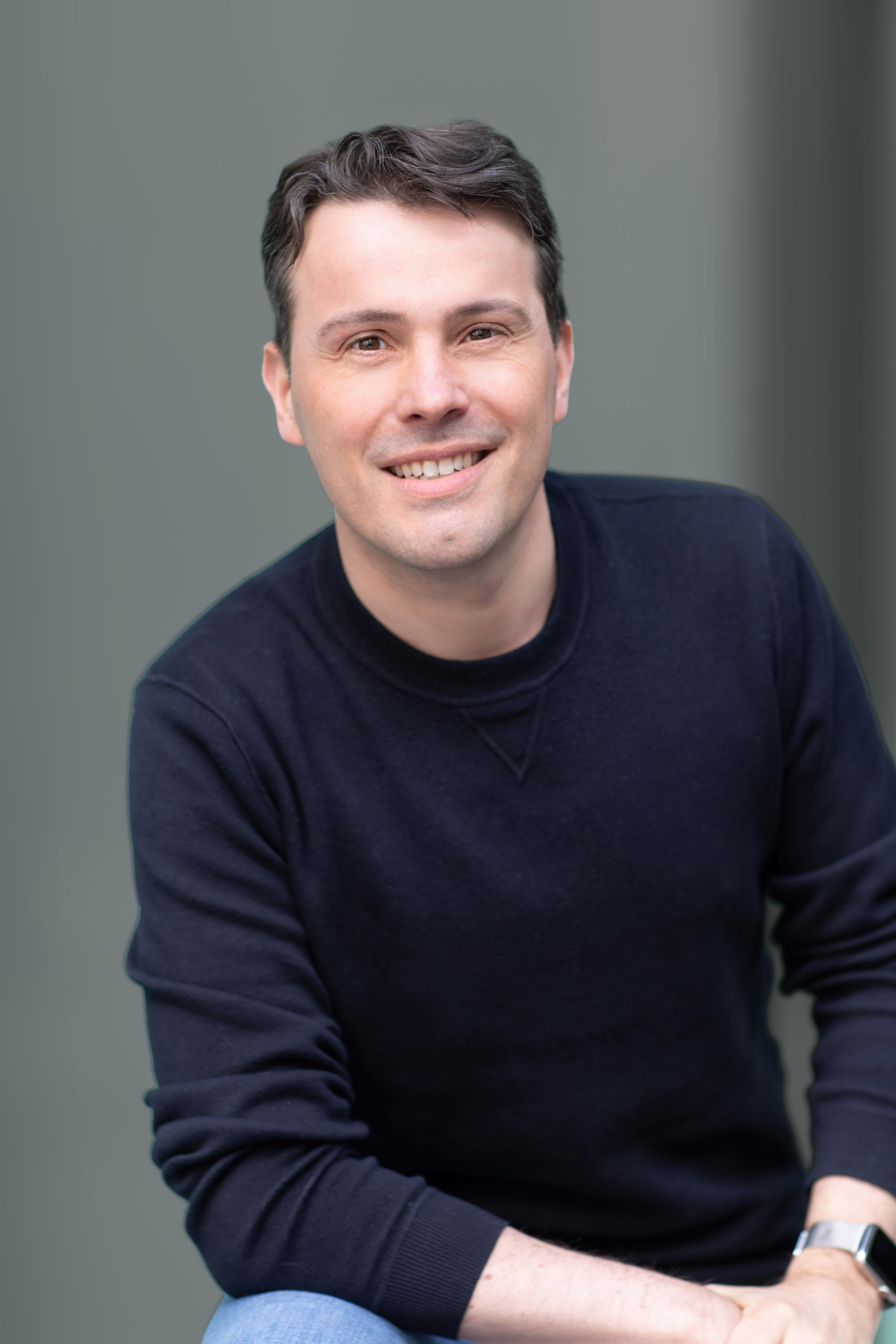
- Vincent Pilette in 2021
- Born: 1972 (age 53–54); Belgium
- Occupation: Businessman
- Known for: CEO of Gen Digital
- Children: 2

Vincent Pilette is an American businessman who is chief executive officer (CEO) of Gen Digital, a Fortune 500 company specializing in consumer cyber safety with brands including Norton, Avast, LifeLock, Avira, AVG, CCleaner, and ReputationDefender. Pilette previously had management roles at Logitech, Electronics for Imaging, and HP.

== Early life and education ==
Pilette was born in 1972 in Belgium.

Pilette holds a M.S. in engineering and business from the Université Catholique de Louvain in Belgium, and an MBA from the Kellogg School of Management at Northwestern University in Chicago.

== Career ==
In 2019, Pilette was appointed CEO of LifeLock, later renamed GenDigital after the 2022 merger with Avast. As CEO, Pilette led the separation of the consumer assets of Symentec and their transformation into NortonLifelock. Pilette directed and implemented the strategy that led to the acquisition of Avast. As a result of its expansion strategy, GenDigital covers 500 million users in 150 countries.

Pilette brought to GenDigital over 20 years of operating experience in the technology sector, with positions at Logitech, Electronics for Imaging and Hewlett-Packard.

Pilette serves on the board of directors of SonicWall, a privately held company in the software space.

== Personal life ==
Pilette is married with two children.
