= Gary Hendrix =

American businessman (born 1948)

Gary Grant Hendrix
- Born: May 14, 1948 (age 78)
- Education: University of Texas
- Known for: Founder of Symantec
- Scientific career
- Workplaces: SRI International

Gary Grant Hendrix (born May 14, 1948) is an American businessman who founded Symantec Corporation, an international corporation which produces computer software, particularly in the fields of information management and antivirus software.

== Education ==
Hendrix obtained his undergraduate degree at the University of Texas in May 1970 and then received his master's degree from the same institution in December 1970. Hendrix decided to study in the artificial intelligence field as Advanced Research Projects Agency announced a series of funding for six projects in natural language understanding in 1970. In January 1971, Hendrix enrolled in the PhD program at the University of Texas and was assigned Robert Simmons as his adviser. He completed his dissertation in 1975.

== Career ==
While at the University of Texas, Hendrix published several papers on robotics and planning, which several people from SRI International read. This led to an invitation for him to work at SRI, which he accepted and subsequently moved to Menlo Park, California. After several years at SRI, he left with fifteen SRI employees to form Machine Intelligence Corporation, which ultimately failed.

Afterward, Hendrix founded Symantec Corporation in 1982 with the help of a National Science Foundation grant. The company was originally focused on artificial intelligence-related projects, and Hendrix hired several Stanford University natural language processing researchers as the company's first employees. To finance the company, Hendrix went to an American Electronics Association financial conference in Monterey, California in May 1983. After demonstrating their product on an early Apple computer, businesses became interested in obtaining their product. Hendrix left the company in 1991 and moved to Dripping Springs, Texas.
