= Veritas Volume Manager =

Logical volume manager

- Developer: Veritas
- Operating system: Windows, Solaris, Linux
- Type: logical volume manager
- License: proprietary

The Veritas Volume Manager (VVM or VxVM) is a proprietary logical volume manager from Veritas (which was part of Symantec until January 2016).

== Details ==
It is available for Windows, IBM AIX, Solaris, Linux, and HP-UX. A modified version is bundled with HP-UX as its built-in volume manager. It offers volume management and Multipath I/O functionalities (when used with Veritas Dynamic Multi-Pathing feature). The Veritas Volume Manager Storage Administrator (VMSA) is a GUI manager.

== Versions ==
- Veritas Volume Manager 7.4.1
  - Release date (Windows): February 2019
- Veritas Volume Manager 6.0
  - Release date (Windows): December 2011
  - Release date (UNIX): December 2011
- Veritas Volume Manager 5.1
  - Release date (Windows): August 2008
  - Release date (UNIX): December 2009
- Veritas Volume Manager 5.0
  - Release date (UNIX): August 2006
  - Release date (Windows): January 2007
- Veritas Volume Manager 4.1
  - Release date (UNIX): April 2005
  - Release date (Windows): June 2004
- Veritas Volume Manager 4.0
  - Release date: February 2004
- Veritas Volume Manager 3.5
  - Release date: September 2002
- Veritas Volume Manager 3.2
- Veritas Volume Manager 3.1
  - Release date: August 2000
- Veritas Volume Manager 3.0

== Litigation ==
In May 2006, Symantec filed a lawsuit alleging Microsoft leaked trade secrets and violated a contract over code used in Windows Vista. In 1996, Microsoft licensed a version of Veritas Volume Manager for Windows 2000, allowing operating systems to store and modify large amounts of data. Symantec acquired Veritas on July 2, 2005, and claimed Microsoft misused their intellectual property to develop functionalities in Windows Server 2003, later Windows Vista and Windows Server 2008, which competed with Veritas' Storage Foundation, according to Michael Schallop, the director of legal affairs at Symantec. A representative claims Microsoft bought all "intellectual property rights for all relevant technologies from Veritas in 2004". The lawsuit was dropped in 2008; terms were not disclosed.

== See also ==
- Veritas Storage Foundation
- Veritas Volume Replicator
- Symantec Operations Readiness Tools (SORT)
