= Peter Norton =

American programmer, software publisher

- Born: November 14, 1943 (age 83); Aberdeen, Washington, U.S.
- Education: Reed College, Portland, Oregon, U.S.
- Occupations: Programmer; Software publisher Technical book author Philanthropist
- Years active: 1965–present
- Spouses: Eileen Harris (m. 1983–2000) Gwen Adams (m. 2007)
- Children: Diana and Michael

Peter Norton (born November 14, 1943) is an American programmer, software publisher, author, and philanthropist. He is best known for the computer programs and books that bear his name and portrait. Norton sold his software business to Symantec Corporation (now Gen Digital) in 1990.

Norton was born in Aberdeen, Washington, and raised in Seattle. He attended Reed College and later worked on mainframes and minicomputers for companies like Boeing and Jet Propulsion Laboratory. Norton founded Peter Norton Computing in 1982, pioneering IBM PC compatible utilities software. His first computer book, "Inside the IBM PC: Access to Advanced Features & Programming," was published in 1983. By 1988, Norton Computing had grown to $15 million in revenue with 38 employees. In 1990, Norton Computing released the Norton Backup program, and in 1990, Norton sold the company to Symantec for $70 million.

Norton later chaired Acorn Technologies and eChinaCash. He has a significant personal art collection and has been involved in various philanthropic endeavors, including the Peter Norton Family Foundation. He has also donated art to numerous museums and universities.

== Early life ==
Norton was born in Aberdeen, Washington, and raised in Seattle. He attended Reed College in Portland, Oregon, and majored in math and philosophy. He graduated in 1965. Before he became involved with microcomputers, he spent a dozen years working on mainframes and minicomputers for companies including Boeing and Jet Propulsion Laboratory. His earliest low-level system utilities were designed to allow mainframe programmers access to a block of RAM that IBM normally reserved for diagnostics.

== Career ==
=== Utility software ===
When the IBM PC made its debut in 1981, Norton was among the first to buy one. After he was laid off during an aerospace industry cutback, he took up microcomputer programming to make ends meet. One day he accidentally deleted a file. Rather than re-enter the data, as most would have, he decided to write a program to recover the information from the disk. His friends were delighted with the program and he developed a group of utility programs that he sold – one at a time – to user groups. In 1982, he founded Peter Norton Computing with $30,000 and an IBM computer. The company was a pioneer in IBM PC compatible utilities software. Its 1982 introduction of the Norton Utilities included Norton's UNERASE tool to retrieve erased data from MS-DOS and IBM PC DOS formatted disks.

In 1984, Norton Computing reached $1 million in revenue, and version 3.0 of the Norton Utilities was released. Norton had three clerical people working for him. He was doing all of the software development, all of the book writing, all of the manual writing and running the business. He hired his fourth employee and first programmer, Brad Kingsbury, in July 1985. In late 1985, Norton hired Barbara Schultz as president, handling day-to-day operations.

In 1985, Norton Computing produced the Norton Editor, a programmer's text editor created by Stanley Reifel, and Norton Guides, a terminate-and-stay-resident program which showed reference information for assembly language and other IBM PC internals, but could also display other reference information compiled into the appropriate file format. Norton Commander, a file managing tool for DOS, was introduced in 1986.

Norton Computing revenue rose to $5 million in 1986, $11 million in 1987, and $15 million in 1988. Its products won several utility awards, and it was ranked 136th on the 1988 Inc. magazine list of the 500 fastest-growing private companies in America, with 38 employees. Norton himself was named "Entrepreneur of the Year" by Arthur Young & Co. (1988 High Technology Award Winner Greater Los Angeles Region) and Venture magazine.

On April 12, 1989, Norton appointed Ron Posner chief executive of Norton Computing. Norton continued as chairman. Posner's goal was to rapidly grow the company into a major software vendor. Soon after his arrival, Posner hired a new president, a new chief financial officer, and added a vice president of sales.

In 1988, Norton Computing had released the Norton Backup program dedicated to backing up and restoring hard disks. Norton Utilities for the Macintosh was launched in 1989.

In 1989, Norton Computing had $25 million in sales. In August 1990, Norton sold it to Symantec for $70 million. Posner orchestrated the merger. Norton was given one-third of Symantec's stock, worth about $60 million, and a seat on Symantec's board of directors. The acquired company became a division of Symantec and was renamed Peter Norton Computing Group. About one-third of Norton Computing's 115 employees were laid off after the merger. The Norton brand name lives on in such Symantec products as Norton AntiVirus, Norton 360, Norton Internet Security, Norton Personal Firewall, Norton SystemWorks (which now contains a current version of the Norton Utilities), Norton AntiBot, Norton AntiSpam, Norton GoBack (formerly Roxio GoBack), Norton PartitionMagic (formerly PowerQuest PartitionMagic), and Norton Ghost. Norton's image was used on the packaging of all Norton-branded products until 2001.

=== Author ===
Jerry Pournelle wrote in 1985 that Norton had "remarkable talents for explaining the complex with clarity". Norton marketed his early software in person, leaving behind little pamphlets with technical notes at users group meetings and computer stores. A publisher saw his pamphlets, and saw that he could write about a technical subject. The publisher called him and asked him if he wanted to write a book. Norton's first computer book, Inside the IBM PC: Access to Advanced Features & Programming (Techniques), was published in 1983. Eight editions of this bestseller were published, the last in 1999. Norton wrote several other technical manuals and introductory computing books. He began writing monthly columns in 1983 for PC Magazine and later PC Week magazine as well, which he wrote until 1987. He soon became recognized as a principal authority on IBM personal computer technology.

In September 1983, Norton started work on The Peter Norton Programmer's Guide to the IBM PC. The book was a popular and comprehensive guide to programming the original IBM PC platform (covering BIOS and MS-DOS system calls in great detail). The first (1985) edition was nicknamed "the pink shirt book", after the pink shirt that Norton wore for the cover photo, and Norton's crossed-arm pose on that cover is a U.S. registered trademark.

First edition of the pink shirt book, with crossed-arm pose

The second (1988) edition, renamed The New Peter Norton Programmer's Guide to the IBM PC & PS/2, again featured the crossed arms, pink shirt cover image. Richard Wilton co-authored the second edition. This was followed by the third (1993) edition of "the Norton book", renamed The Peter Norton PC Programmer's Bible, co-authored with Wilton and Peter Aitken. Later editions of Peter Norton's Inside the PC, a broad-brush introduction to personal computer technology, featured Norton in his crossed-arm pose on the cover, wearing a white shirt.

=== Later career ===
In 2002, Acorn Technologies lured Norton out of a 10-year business hibernation. Norton has a "significant investment" in the company and serves as Chairman of Acorn's board of directors.

Norton is chairman of eChinaCash, a company he founded in 2003. Posner is CEO.

== Personal life ==
Norton spent around five years in a Buddhist monastery in the San Francisco Bay area during the 1970s. In 1983, Norton married Eileen Harris, a woman who grew up in Watts, California. They lived in the Los Angeles area where they had two children.

In the summer of 1990, they vacationed on Martha's Vineyard, Massachusetts. They enjoyed it enough to return the following year and look for a house there. They purchased Corbin House, an 1891 eight-bedroom Queen Anne house in Oak Bluffs, originally built for lock and hardware industrialist Philip Corbin. They also purchased a nearby house to be close on hand to the redesign and renovation of the main house. The renovation was completed in 1994. "My children are half-black, and we thought Oak Bluffs would give them an opportunity to summer around other kids like them," Norton said in a 2007 interview with Laura D. Roosevelt for Martha's Vineyard Magazine, alluding to Oak Bluff's century-old reputation as a popular summer spot among upper-class black people.

In 2000, the couple divorced. Norton afterward lived much of the time in New York. In February 2001, a fire caused by faulty wiring destroyed the Martha's Vineyard home; Norton had it rebuilt to almost exactly as it was before the fire. Meanwhile, he began a relationship with New York financier Gwen Adams, originally from the Virgin Islands who lived in the area. The couple spends ten weeks of summer in the Corbin-Norton House annually. In May 2007, they married in a church in nearby Edgartown; the ceremony was performed by their neighbor, scholar and author Henry Louis Gates Jr.

== Philanthropy ==
In 1989 Peter and Eileen Norton founded the Peter Norton Family Foundation, which gave financial support to visual and contemporary non-profit arts organizations, as well as human social services organizations. The foundation was dissolved as part of the divorce, and two successor foundations were created.

Norton serves on the boards of the California Institute of Technology, California Institute of the Arts, Crossroads School (Santa Monica, California), and the Museum of Modern Art in New York (since 1999). He is a trustee emeritus of Reed College.

In 2003, Norton became the chairman of the board of MoMA PS1 in Long Island City, New York. In 2004, he re-joined the Whitney Museum of American Art's board after leaving it in 1998. He also serves on the executive committee of the Guggenheim Museum’s International Directors’ Council, the museum's primary acquisition committee, and on the board of the Los Angeles County Museum of Art.

With his first wife, Norton accumulated one of the largest modern contemporary art collections in the United States. Many of the pieces are on loan all over the world at any given time; many were on view at Symantec Corporation. The foundation and the Norton Family Office are located in Santa Monica. ARTnews magazine regularly lists Norton among the world's top 200 collectors.

In 1999, Norton purchased letters written to Joyce Maynard by reclusive author J. D. Salinger for $156,500. (Salinger had a year-long affair with Maynard in 1972 when she was 18.) Maynard said she was forced to auction the letters for financial reasons. Norton announced that his intention was to return the letters to Salinger.

In 1999 Norton donated $600,000 to the Signature Theatre Company (New York City) which renamed its home Off Broadway theatre at 555 West 42nd Street to "Signature Theatre Company at the Peter Norton Space." It maintained that name until the theatre moved to a new venue in 2012.

In March 2015, Norton organized a second major art donation project: he donated numerous pieces from his personal art collection to museums internationally. The Rose Art Museum received 41 artworks, ranging from prints, sculptures, photography, and other mixed media.

In April 2016, Norton donated an additional 100+ pieces from his personal art collection to selected university art museums, namely, 75 pieces to the University of California, Riverside ARTSblock organization and 68 pieces to Northwestern University's Block Museum.

== Books ==
- Inside the IBM PC: Access to Advanced Features & Programming Techniques (1983) ISBN 9780893035563
- The Peter Norton Programmer's Guide to the IBM PC (1985) ISBN 978-0914845461
- Visual Basic For Windows Versão 3.0, Tradução 3a.Edição Americana, Author: Steven Olzner/The Peter Norton Computing Group, Editora Campus, (1993) ISBN 85-7001-854-1
- Peter Norton's Assembly Language Book for the IBM PC by Peter Norton, John Socha (1986) ISBN 9780136619017
- Peter Norton's Intro to Computers 6/e by Peter Norton (2004) ISBN 9780072978902
- Inside the IBM PC by Peter Norton (1985) ISBN 978-0893035839
- Peter Norton's Guide to UNIX by Peter Norton, Harley Hahn (1991) ISBN 978-0553352603
- Peter Norton's Introduction to Computers Fifth Edition, Computing Fundamentals, Student Edition by Peter Norton
- Peter Norton's Guide to Visual Basic 6 by Peter Norton, Michael R. Groh
- Peter Norton's DOS Guide Peter Norton's DOS Guide by Peter Norton
- Advanced Assembly Language, with Disk by Peter Norton
- Peter Norton's New Inside the PC by Peter Norton, Scott Clark
- Complete Guide to Networking by Peter Norton, David Kearns
- Peter Norton's Complete Guide to DOS 6.22 by Peter Norton
- Peter Norton's Guide to Windows Programming with MFC: With CDROM by Peter Norton
- PC Problem Solver by Peter Norton, Robert Jourdain
- Peter Norton's Windows 3.1 Pow by Peter Norton
- Peter Norton's Guide to Access 2000 Programming (Peter Norton (Sams)) by Peter Norton, Virginia Andersen
- Peter Norton's Complete Guide to Windows XP by Peter Norton, John Paul Mueller
- Peter Norton's Upgrading And Repairing PCs by Peter Norton, Michael Desmond
- Peter Norton's Introduction to Computers: Essential Concepts by Peter Norton
- Peter Norton's Maximizing Windows NT Server 4 by Peter Norton
- Peter Norton's Advanced DOS 6 by Peter Norton, Ruth Ashley, Judi N. Fernandez
- Peter Norton's Network Security Fundamentals by Peter Norton, Mike Stockman
- Peter Norton's Guide to Qanda 4 by Peter Norton, Dave Meyers
- The Peter Norton's Introduction to Computers Windows NT 4.0 Tutorial with 3.5 IBM Disk by Peter Norton
- Essential Concepts by Peter Norton
- Peter Norton's Macintosh by Peter Norton
- Word 2002: A Tutorial to Accompany Peter Norton's Introduction to Computers Student Edition with CD-ROM by Peter Norton
- Peter Norton's Introduction to Computers MS-Works 4.0 for Windows 95 Tutorial with 3.5 IBM Disk by Peter Norton, Kim Bobzien
- Peter Norton's Guide to Visual C++ [With CD (Audio)] by Peter Norton
- Complete Guide to TCP/IP by Peter Norton, Doug Eckhart (Joint Author)
- Peter Norton's Maximizing Windows 98 Administration (Sams)
