= Norton (software) =

Online privacy, security, and identity management company

- Product type: Security software
- Current owner: Gen Digital
- Introduced: 1982; 44 years ago
- Markets: Worldwide
- Previous owners: Peter Norton Computing (1982-1990)
- Website: www.norton.com

Norton is a family of computer products and software focused on digital security, privacy, identity protection, and utilities. It is owned by the American company Gen.

The brand was founded in 1982 by Peter Norton Computing and acquired by Symantec in 1990. Norton was originally a suite of utility software for IBM DOS, expanded into user guides for IBM DOS and then utilities and guides for Microsoft DOS in 1982, and eventually expanded into services for Microsoft Windows. After acquiring Norton Computing in 1989, Symantec merged their anti-virus software into the Norton package and rebranded it as Norton AntiVirus which was released in 1991.

In 2014 Symantec separated their business into two units. One was focused on security, and the other was focused on information management; Norton was placed in the unit focused on security. Symantec was renamed to NortonLifeLock in 2019 following Broadcom’s acquisition of its enterprise division.

As of 2025, Norton is a consumer cybersecurity brand of Gen, the parent company formed following the merger between NortonLifeLock and Avast. It currently covers a variety of products and services related to digital security, identity protection, and online privacy and utilities.

== History ==
Peter Norton Computing was a software company founded in 1982 by Peter Norton. Norton and his company developed various DOS utilities including the Norton Utilities, which originally did not include antivirus features.

The company was acquired by Symantec in 1990. In early 1991 Symantec's Norton Computer Group launched Norton AntiVirus 1.0 for computers. The company updated and diversified its product line until combining its offerings into one seamless product, Norton Security. Ads for the product, with suggested retail $129, featured Norton in his crossed-arm pose from the user guides, wearing a pink shirt and surgical mask covering his nose and mouth.

In the 1990s, Norton provided software to check computer systems for Y2K compliance.

In 2017, Symantec acquired the online identity threat protection company, LifeLock. In 2019, Symantec was renamed to NortonLifeLock following Broadcom's acquisition of its enterprise division. This rebranding also led to the combination of the Norton 360 suite with the LifeLock identity threat protection offering.

In 2019, Norton 360 was reintroduced, replacing Norton Security and adding privacy features, including a VPN service and identity theft protection services alongside its traditional antivirus features.

== Products and services ==
Norton's products are primarily digital security tools for personal computers, server devices and mobile devices. It is currently compatible with PCs running Windows, macOS, Android and iOS, and is available as an annual subscription. Norton software is licensed to consumers and small businesses.

=== Norton 360 ===
The brand's primary product is Norton 360, available in multiple editions. Norton 360 includes real-time threat protection, scam protection, Norton's Secure VPN, cloud backup, a password manager, and a smart firewall. A mobile version of the software is also available. Some versions include parental controls and digital identity features, including dark web monitoring for leaks of personal information. In January 2022, The Verge reported that a crypto-mining tool was included in the Norton 360 security software suite that allowed users to use unused GPU cycles to earn cryptocurrency; the cryptocurrency offering was retired in September 2022.

=== Antivirus and other tools ===
Norton also offers its traditional antivirus software, Norton AntiVirus Plus, as a standalone service. There are also separate subscriptions for Norton AntiTrack, Norton VPN, and Norton Privacy Monitor Assistant. Other products, including PC tune-up and optimization software (Norton Utilities), identity protection (LifeLock), and others, are also available as separate offerings.

== Awards ==
- 2022 - Norton 360 was awarded Best Protection (Windows), Best Android Security Product, and Best MacOS Security Product by AV-TEST
- 2022 - Norton 360 was won AV-Comparatives's Gold Award for Malware Protection
- 2023 - SE Labs recognized Norton 360 as the Best Home Anti-Malware Solution in its annual report
- In November 2023, Norton 360 Deluxe maintained the PCMag Editors’ Choice award and "Excellent" rating
- 2024 - Norton 360 - AV-TEST Institute Best MacOS Security Award for 2024
- 2025 - Norton - All About Cookies best Antivirus for 2025

== Logos ==
1990-2001

2001-2007

2007-2010

2010-2019

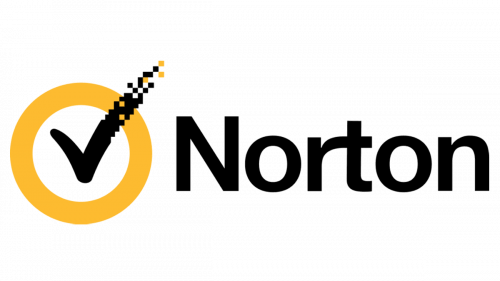
2019-2021

2021-present

== See also ==
- List of password managers
- LifeLock
- Gen Digital
