= Norton Family =

Cloud-based parental control service by Norton

- Developer: Norton
- Release: April 27, 2009
- Operating system: iOS, Android, Windows XP 32-bit, Vista 32 and 64-bit, Mac OS X 10.5
- Type: Parental controls
- License: Proprietary
- Website: family.norton.com

Norton Family (previously known as Online Family.Norton and Norton Online Family) is an American cloud-based parental control service. Norton Family is aimed at "fostering communication" involving parents and their children's online activities. Computer activities are monitored by the software client and made available to the parents. It is sold as a standalone product, as well as bundled in the Norton 360 suite.

The separate product Norton Family Assistant, is a secured AI agent that helps manage family logistics, such as coordinating schedules and groceries. It is offered independent of Norton Family.

== Development ==
Symantec debuted a beta version of Online Family on February 17, 2009. Its debut coincided with Symantec's announcement of the Norton Online Family Advisory Council, a committee of experts in various child care fields who will test and provide insight on the beta. Citing a Rochester Institute of Technology study, the company intends to bridge the gap between the percentage of parents versus children who report no online supervision.

The software was renamed to OnlineFamily.Norton and released April 27, 2009, dubbed by Symantec as the Internet Safety Week. It is now part of Norton 360, as well as other Norton offerings and being sold separately.

== Overview ==
Norton Family can monitor Internet, instant messenger, video, and social-networking sites' traffic. On shared computers, it depends on the Norton Safety Minder to enforce policies and report activities for individual accounts. Norton Family emphasizes transparency between parents and children, attempting to create "open" and "ongoing dialogue".

Norton Family blocks objectionable websites by allowing parents to select among up to forty five categories of material to be limited, with options to block fully or provide warnings. On attempt to visit a blocked site, children may receive a pop-up warning and an explanatory note. Whenever a rule is ignored, it is logged.

The service can define when children have access to a computer; parents can define a range of hours when children are blocked, with separate settings for each child, weekdays and weekends. A daily time quota can be configured as well. Children receive a warning 15 minutes prior before blocks begin or a time limit is exceeded. The time-management feature can also warn children, rather than cutting off access. Exceeding limits will result in a log entry. Time limits are enforced across multiple PCs. Changing the system time does not affect Online Family. The activity will be logged, however.

Norton Family can e-mail parents when certain events occur. Notifications include the noted event, the child's name, and the time of the incident. Parents can choose which events trigger a notification. Reports of activities are also presented in the online console. Settings can be changed and applied almost instantaneously. Children will receive a pop-up announcing the updated rules. Rules can be overridden immediately by a parent.

== See also ==
- Gen Digital
- Norton (software)
- Norton 360
- Norton AntiVirus
- List of content-control software
- Content-control software
- Parental controls
