= Norton Core =

WiFi router

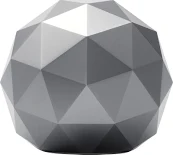
The Norton Core router in its silver color. A gold color was also available.

Norton Core is a discontinued mesh WiFi router that was introduced at the 2017 CES by Symantec (now NortonLifeLock) as a part of their Norton brand. It was marketed as a "Secure WiFi Router," as it protects connected devices by defending the network against online threats and blocking unsafe websites. The network can be controlled through a mobile app where users can view their "security score," set up and manage their router, and manage devices connected to it. It competes with the Bitdefender Box and CUJO AI. TIME rated Norton Core as one of the "25 Best Inventions of 2017."

Norton Core faced limited acceptance from the public, and was criticized for requiring an expensive subscription. As a result, the Norton Core router was discontinued on January 31, 2019, with the sale of it ending immediately. Support ended on April 15, 2022, revised from its original January 2021 date.

== Specifications ==
Norton Core consists of a 2.4 to 5 GHz frequency band, 1 GB of RAM, 4 GB of memory, a 1.7 GHz Qualcomm processor, Bluetooth 4.0 support, four Ethernet ports (1 WAN, 3 LAN), and two USB ports. There were silver and gold color options for the router.
