= NCache =

NCache may refer to:

- DNS NCACHE, an Internet standard used by the Domain Name System
- NCACHE, a disk caching utility included in the Norton Utilities utility suite
