= NPE =

NPE may refer to:

== Transport ==
- Napier Airport, New Zealand, by IATA code
- New Pantai Expressway, an expressway in Klang Valley region, Malaysia
- Nationale Plattform Elektromobilität, the German National Platform for Electric Mobility

== Science and technology ==
- New political economy, a sub-school within the field of political economy
- Nonylphenol ethoxylates, mixtures of nonionic surfactants
- Non-paternity event, a paternal relationship that is shown to be false through DNA testing
- Norton Power Eraser, a tool that scans a computer system for threats
- Null pointer exception, a form of run-time error in many programming languages

== Other ==
- National Party of Europe, in politics
- National Policy on Education, in India
- New Popular Edition, maps published by the Ordnance Survey
- Non-practicing entity, a type of patent owner
