= Norton System Insight =

Software

- Developer(s): Symantec Corporation

The Norton System Insight is part of Performance monitoring system, found in Norton 2010–2012 lines. It monitors and displays information about downloaded files, installed applications, scans and detected security risks. It also shows the number of performance alerts. In addition, it represents the CPU and memory usage for 30 days in a graphical way, which should be easier for understanding and provides links to Norton Insight, Startup Manager and "Optimize" button, which defragments the system drive. System Insight can be launched with a click on the "Performance" link.
