= Peter Norton Computing =

Software company

Peter Norton Computing, Inc.
- Industry: Software Engineering
- Founded: 1982; 44 years ago
- Founder: Peter Norton
- Fate: merged into Symantec (in 1990)
- Successor: Symantec (then NortonLifeLock later Gen Digital)

Peter Norton Computing, Inc. was a software company founded by Peter Norton. The first and best known software package it produced was Norton Utilities. Another successful software package was Norton Commander, especially the DOS version. The company in this form lasted from its founding in 1982 until 1990, when it was acquired by Symantec (now Gen Digital).

The Symantec merger helped Norton Computing regain the market share it was losing to competitors, especially Central Point Software. Norton Computing's revenues tripled between June 1990 and September 1991, and by November it appeared to have regained the market lead over Central Point.

== History ==
Peter Norton founded the company in 1982 with $30,000 and an IBM computer. The company was a pioneer in DOS-based utilities software. Its 1982 introduction of the Norton Utilities included Norton's UNERASE tool to retrieve erased data from DOS disks.

In 1984, Norton Computing reached $1 million in revenue, and version 3.0 of the Norton Utilities was released. Norton had three clerical people working for him. He was doing all of the software development, all of the book writing, all of the manual writing and running the business. The only thing he wasn't doing was stuffing the packages. He hired his fourth employee and first programmer, Brad Kingsbury, in July 1985. John Socha, the author of Norton Commander until 1989, was hired shortly after. From November 1985 until April 1986 Warren Woodford worked at Norton Computing and created Norton Guides. In late 1985, Norton hired a business manager to take care of the day-to-day operations.

In 1985, Norton Computing produced the Norton Editor, a programmer's text editor created by Stanley Reifel, and Norton Guides, a terminate-and-stay-resident program which showed reference information for assembly language and other IBM PC internals, but could also display other reference information compiled into the appropriate file format. Norton Commander, a file managing tool for DOS, was introduced in 1986. In this year PNCI reached $5 million in revenues with Norton Utilities still bringing the largest parts.

In 1990, the company was acquired by Symantec. The acquired company became a division of Symantec and was renamed Peter Norton Computing Group. Most of Norton Computing's 115 employees were retained.

== PNC software launched prior to Symantec acquisition ==
- Norton Utilities (1982) (✓ Merged with Norton System Works)
- Norton Editor (1985)
- Norton Guides (1985)
- Norton Commander (1986) ✓
- Norton Backup (1990) ✓
- Norton Utilities for Macintosh (1990) ✓

✓ denotes software that continues to be published after the acquisition by Symantec. (Check listed for standalone and integrated components within packages)

== PNC software launched after Symantec acquisition ==
- Norton AntiVirus (NAV)
- Norton AntiVirus for Mac (NAVMAC)
- Norton AntiVirus (Windows) (NavW)
- Norton CleanSweep (NCS)
- Norton Crashguard (NCG)
- Norton Desktop for DOS (NDD)
- Norton Desktop for Apple (NDA)
- Norton Desktop for Windows (NDW)
- Norton Internet Security (NIS)
- Norton Internet Security for Macintosh (NISMAC)
- Norton SystemWorks (NSW)
- Norton Uninstall (NUD)
- Norton Uninstaller (NUW)
- Norton 360 (N360)
- Norton 360 Multi-Device (N360MD)
- Norton One (NO)
- Norton Security (NS)
- Norton Security Deluxe with LifeLock Standard

== See also ==
- List of Symantec acquisitions
