= Norton Safe Web =

Software service by Symantec Corporation

- Norton Internet Security Screenshot Norton Safe Web Dialogue
- Developer: Symantec Corporation
- Operating system: Microsoft Windows
- License: Proprietary
- Website: safeweb.norton.com

Norton Safe Web (sometimes abbreviated NSW) is a browser extension developed by Norton (a brand of Gen Digital) that is designed to help users avoid visiting malicious websites. Safe Web delivers information about websites based on automated analysis and user feedback, and blocks sites that are potentially unsafe. It is available as a free browser extension, as well as bundled with other products such as Norton 360.

== Function ==
An older version of Norton Safe Web differentiating Google web searches as safe (green) and unsafe web search (red)

In addition to actively crawling and analyzing web sites, Norton Safe Web relies on feedback from users and Norton Community participants. When a drive-by download occurs at a web site, the suspicious URL is automatically reported to Norton Safe Web for analysis. The reported site is rated as unsafe if the analysis confirms that the download is malicious.

To ensure that its site rating accurately reflects the current state of a site, Norton Safe Web performs frequent re-analysis of Web sites. Norton Safe Web employs a site rating aging algorithm which estimates how often the safety of a particular Web site will change. Some of the factors used in this analysis include the site's rating history, the site's reputation and associations, the number and types of threats detected on the site, the number of submissions received from Norton clients, and site traffic. In other words, unsafe sites that are more likely to have been cleaned up are re-analyzed often while those that might take longer to remove detected threats are re-analyzed less frequently. User reviews are also accepted, with contributors ranked by reputation. Should a site owner dispute the ranking of their site, they can submit a request for re-evaluation after completing a validation process.

== History ==
The service was originally developed by Symantec. The software debuted as a public beta in 2008, and is now included in current versions of Norton Internet Security and Norton 360.

Safe Web operates as a web browser plugin, and requires Internet Explorer 6 or Firefox 3 or later. The 2012 release of Safe Web Lite added Google Chrome support.

Safe Web is installed alongside Norton Internet Security 2009 and Norton 360 version 3.0 as a browser toolbar. It color codes search results returned by Yahoo!, Google, and Bing Search using green, yellow, or red. Hovering over a pop-up summary will bring up a summary of the findings, and include a link to the full report of the site. Safe Web will also prompt or interrupt access to malicious sites users try to access directly via the address bar.

A free version of the software, Safe Web Lite, was made available free of charge around 2011. At the time, the primary difference between the version of Safe Web bundled with Norton Internet Security and Norton 360 and Safe Web Lite was that Safe Web Lite did not block malicious websites. The full version of Safe Web was later made available for free as a browser extension, as well as being bundled into other services.

As of 2025, Norton Safe Web sits alongside the free Norton Safe Search and Norton Home Page browser extensions.

=== Critics ===
Norton Safe Web was complained about by many users/web administrators as websites will be classified as "unsafe" incorrectly. Even if reevaluation request is submitted, the site will still be listed as "unsafe" and no reevaluation action is taken place indeed.

== Reception ==
Safe Web blocks phishing sites, overlapping in functionality with Norton Internet Security and Norton 360. Using Norton 360 v3, PC Magazine found discrepancies between Safe Web and Norton 360's built-in phishing protection. Symantec stated that phishing sites change rapidly, and one Norton service may be using older definitions than the other. Norton Safe Web has drawn some ire among Windows Live! Plus users as it shows that the Windows Live! Plus website contains malware.

== See also ==
- McAfee SiteAdvisor
- WOT: Web of Trust
