= McAfee WebAdvisor =

Website safety report software

McAfee SiteAdvisor
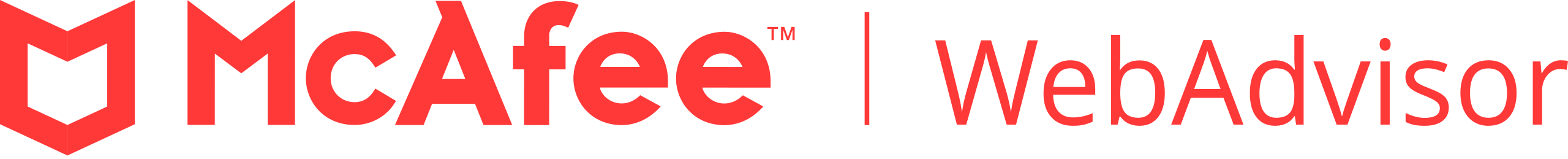

- Developer: McAfee
- Release: April 2006
- Operating system: Cross-platform
- Website: siteadvisor.com archive

McAfee WebAdvisor, previously known as McAfee SiteAdvisor, is a service that reports on the safety of web sites by crawling the web and testing the sites it finds for malware and spam. A browser extension can show these ratings on hyperlinks such as on web search results.

The service was originally developed by SiteAdvisor, Inc, an MIT startup first introduced at CodeCon on February 10, 2006, and later acquired by McAfee on April 5, 2006.

== Usage ==
Prior to mid-October 2014, the functionality of SiteAdvisor could be accessed by submitting a URL to the website at https://www.siteadvisor.com/sites/, but can now also be accessed through a downloadable Browser Plugin.

Sites are rated in levels of Safe (green tick), Suspicious (yellow exclamation mark) and Unsafe (red "X").

Additional features include:

- Rates email and IM links
- Indicates sites potentially harmful to your computer
- Allows users to safely shorten URLs when sharing links
- Alerts users to possible phishing and identity theft scams
- Redirects you away from red and yellow sites (if Protected Mode is enabled).

== Products and services ==
McAfee WebAdvisor is available as a free download on McAfee's website as well as bundled with McAfee Antivirus Plus, McAfee Internet Security, McAfee Total Protection, McAfee McAfee+ Premium, McAfee+ Advanced, McAfee+ Ultimate, and McAfee Business Protection.

McAfee WebAdvisor makes use of the TrustedSource website reputation organisation, to act as something like a 'cloud' intelligence software to get the most up-to-date information on websites as possible, very similar to McAfee's Active Protection (Artemis) system. The details of this system are not known.

Other features of McAfee WebAdvisor include:

- Download Protection - This can stop downloads which are considered to be slightly, probably or possibly risky depending on setting determined by the user.
- Protection against accidental clicks
- Blocks malware and phishing websites if you accidentally click on a malicious link.
- Protection against typos - Warns you if you enter a web address incorrectly and points you to the correct one.
- Social Media Protection - color-codes links in your social media feeds to show you which ones are safe.

== Games and quizzes ==
In March 2006, McAfee launched a JavaScript-based quiz which has users pick between sites rated as safe and unsafe.

A flash-based memory training game called WebQuest was launched around 2007.

== Studies and research ==
WebAdvisor has published various reports regarding online threats such as typosquatting, where mistyped domains may lead to sites ranging from harmless pay-per-click and domain parking sites to pornographic and malware sites.

== Criticism ==
=== False negatives ===
The very nature of WebAdvisor and the long periods between site crawls mean that, even if the WebAdvisor tests were 100% accurate, a Safe rating offers no guarantee of safety. Malicious code and browser exploits often spread fast over large numbers of websites, meaning a Safe rating may not be up to date and provide a false sense of security. To resolve this, McAfee WebAdvisor now uses McAfee's AI technology to analyze site content before a website is opened.

== Awards ==
- Time magazine named SiteAdvisor.com among the 50 coolest websites of 2006.
- Popular Science awarded SiteAdvisor the "Best of What's New" award in the Computing category for 2006.
- PC World ranked SiteAdvisor at #15 in "The 100 Best Products of 2007."

== See also ==
- Norton Safe Web
- Website Reputation Ratings
- WOT: Web of Trust
