= WOT Services =

Website reputation service

- Developer: WOT Services
- Release: 2007
- Type: browser add-on
- Website: www.mywot.com

WOT Services is the developer of MyWOT (also known as WOT and Web of Trust), an online reputation and Internet safety service which shows indicators of trust about existing websites. The confidence level is based both on user ratings and on third-party malware, phishing, scam and spam blacklists. The service also provides crowdsourced reviews, about to what extent websites are trustworthy, and respect user privacy, vendor reliability and child safety.

Its website user interface is available in six languages, namely, English, French, German, Japanese, Portuguese and Russian. Its website uses machine translation on the domain name scorecard webpages for logged-in users/commenters.

== History ==
WOT Services was founded in 2006 by Sami Tolvanen and Timo Ala-Kleemola, who wrote the MyWOT software as post-graduates at the Tampere University of Technology in Finland. They launched the service officially in 2007, with Esa Suurio as CEO. Suurio was replaced in November 2009, and both founders left the company in 2014.

In 2009, MySQL founder Michael Widenius invested in WOT Services and became a member of the board of directors. WOT Services is no longer a portfolio company of Widenius's venture capital firm, OpenOcean.vc.

WOT Services has partnerships with Mail.ru, Facebook, hpHosts, Legit Script, Panda Security, Phish tank, GlobalSign and TRUSTe.

By November 2013, WOT Services had over 100 million downloads.

A 2016 Norddeutscher Rundfunk investigation revealed that WOT Services sold user activity data collected from its apps and browser extensions to third parties in violation of the privacy policies of the app stores on which the software was distributed.

In 2016, it was revealed that WOT Services had made money by collecting browsing history data from its users and selling that usage data; it said that it anonymized the data before selling it.

== Sale of user-related data ==
In November 2016, a German state media investigation found that WOT Services had secretly collected personal user details and sold or licensed this information to unidentified third-party businesses and entities for data monetization purposes. This activity breached the privacy rules and guidelines set by several browsers. As a result, the browser add-on was involuntarily removed from Mozilla Firefox's add-on store, and voluntarily removed from other browsers' add-on/extension stores. WOT was eventually reinstated.

On November 1, 2016, German public broadcasting station NDR reported the results of an investigation by in-house journalists, showing that WOT collected, recorded, analyzed and sold user-related data to third parties. The data obtained was traceable to WOT and could be assigned to specific individuals, despite WOT's claim that user data was anonymized. The NDR investigative journalism report was based on freely available sample data, and revealed that sensitive private information of more than 50 users could be retrieved. The information included websites visited, account names and email addresses, potentially revealing user illnesses, sexual preferences and drug consumption. The journalists also reconstructed a media company's confidential revenue data, and details about an ongoing police investigation.

German media contacted WOT Services with the results of the investigation prior to publication of the report. WOT declined to comment on the findings.

A few days after the news story aired, Mozilla removed the browser add-on from the Firefox add-on store. WOT subsequently removed its browsing tool for other browsers, including Chrome and Opera. The WOT "Mobile Security & Protection" mobile app was removed from Google Play, approximately one week after the extension was removed from the Google Chrome extension store.

In a blog post published on December 19, 2016, WOT Services stated that they had upgraded their browser extension, and released it in the Google Chrome extension gallery. The upgraded version included "several major code updates in order to protect our user's privacy and an opt-out option from the user Settings, for users who do not wish to share data with us but still want to have easy access to WOT." In February 2017, Mozilla reinstated the MyWOT browsing tool in the Firefox add-on store.

== MyWOT addon ==
WOT Services offers an add-on for web browsers including Firefox, Google Chrome, Opera, Internet Explorer and Baidu. The extension rates websites based on their reputation score and provides end users with a red, yellow, or green indicator, with red meaning that the site has a poor reputation score.

== Lawsuits ==
In February 2011, a lawsuit in Florida (United States) was filed against WOT and some of its forum members, demanding that WOT remove certain website ratings and associated comments cautioning about phishing scams. The court dismissed the case with prejudice. In Germany, some preliminary injunctions were issued by courts, to delete feedback.

== See also ==
- McAfee SiteAdvisor
- Netcraft
- Norton Safe Web
- Website Reputation Ratings
- Google SafeSearch
