= Norton Utilities Ultimate =

Computer utility software

- Norton Utilities version 15.0 on Windows in approximately 2011
- Developer: Gen Digital
- Stable release: Ongoing (unversioned)
- Operating system: Windows, Classic Mac OS, Mac OS X, Unix
- Type: Utility software
- License: Proprietary
- Website: us.norton.com/products/norton-utilities-ultimate

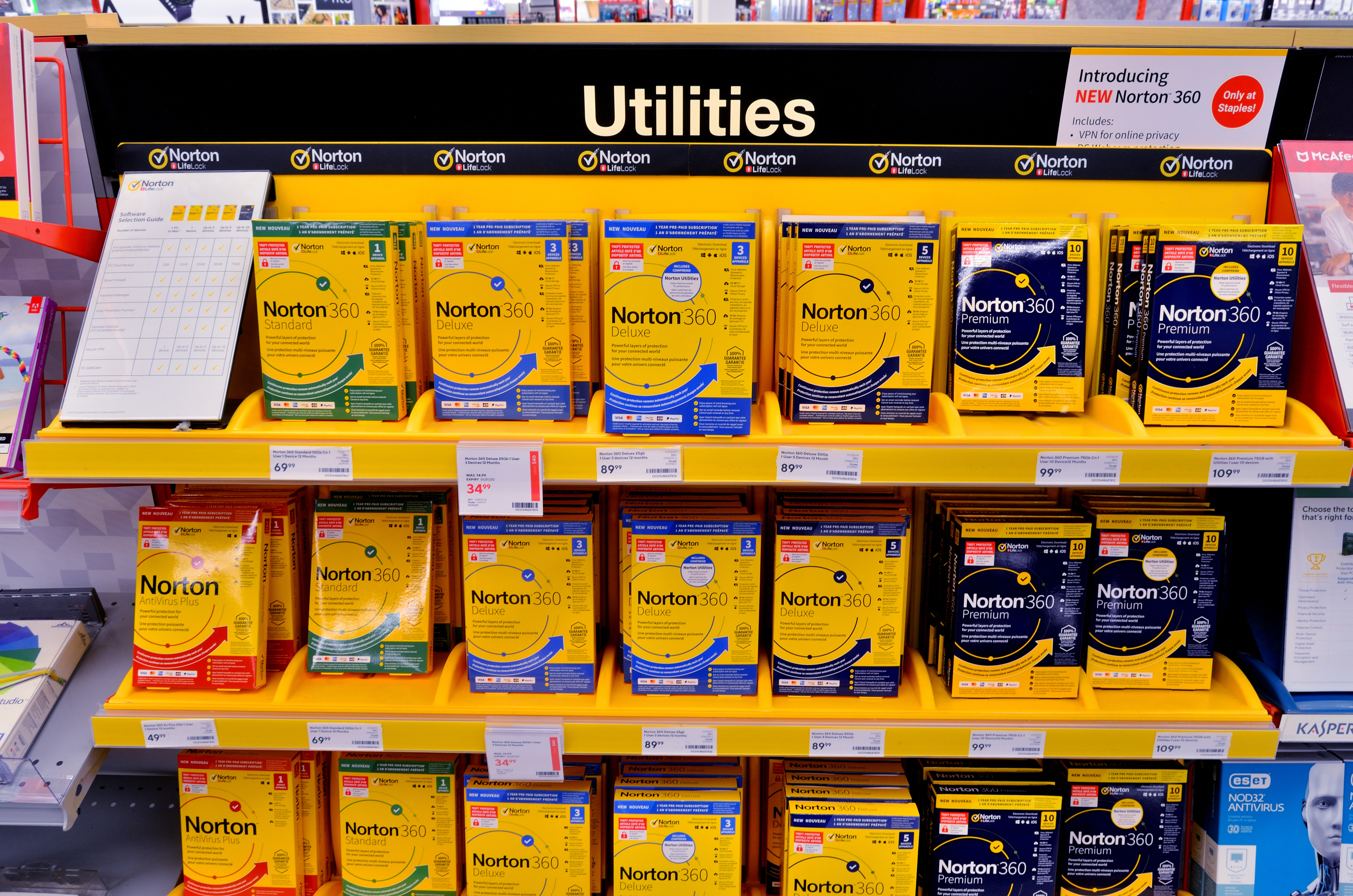
Norton Utilities at a retail store

Norton Utilities Ultimate is a utility software suite designed to help analyze, configure, optimize and maintain a computer. The latest version of Norton Utilities Ultimate is available as a standalone subscription service, independent of the Norton 360 package.

Peter Norton published the first version for DOS, The Norton Utilities, Release 1, in 1982. Release 2 came out about a year later, subsequent to the first hard drives for the IBM PC line. Peter Norton's company was sold to Symantec (now known as Gen Digital) in 1990 and the Norton Utilities naming continued for successor products.

== Current version ==
Norton Utilities Ultimate is sold by Gen as a continually updated (unversioned) digital download. It is sold separately from other Gen and Norton products. It is available for Windows, Mac, iOS and Android.

== Older versions ==
Norton Utilities was first released in 1982 as Version 1.0. The initial release supported DOS 1.x and featured the UNERASE utility, allowing files to be undeleted. This feature was not available in DOS at the time, thus driving the success of Norton Utilities by allowing users to undo their mistakes. Peter Norton said

"Why did The Norton Utilities become such popular software? Well, industry wisdom has it that software becomes standard either by providing superior capabilities or by solving problems that were previously unsolvable. In 1982, when I sat down at my PC to write Unerase, I was solving a common problem to which there was no readily available solution."

The first release included 14 programs on three floppy disks, at a 1982 list price of $80 (equivalent to $267 in today's dollars):

Over the years, new versions added functions, added support for Windows, Mac and Linux systems, and eventually became a subscription product.

== Reviews ==
A 2021 TechAdvisor review rated Norton Utilities Ultimate as 3.5/5 stars noting it as "easy to use" and "comprehensive," but removing points for the price at the time.

=== Older versions ===
BYTE in 1989 listed Norton Utilities 4.5 for DOS as among the "Distinction" winners of the BYTE Awards, stating that it was "an essential first-aid kit". That year Jerry Pournelle said regarding 4.5, "I'm already on record as saying that everyone needs the Norton Utilities ... [4.5] is a major upgrade, and worth getting. Recommended".

== Controversies ==
=== 2012 source code releases ===
In January 2012, a hacker known as "Yama Tough" obtained Symantec's source code by hacking an Indian government server. Tough released parts of the source code. According to Chris Paden, a Symantec spokesman, the source code that was taken was from enterprise products that were between five and six years old at the time. In September 2012, an affiliate of the hacker group "Anonymous" published the source code for Norton Utilities. Symantec responded that this was from the same code leaked in January 2012. The leak included source code for 2006 versions of Norton Utilities, pcAnywhere and Norton AntiVirus.

== See also ==
- Norton 360
