= Norton Guides =

Norton Guides manual and disks

Norton Guides were a product family sold by Peter Norton Computing. The guides were written in 1985 by Warren Woodford for the x86 Assembly Language, C, BASIC, and Forth languages and made available to DOS users via a terminate-and-stay-resident (TSR) program that integrated with programming language editors on IBM PC type computers.

Norton Guides appears to be one of the first Online help systems and the first example of a commercial product where programming reference information was integrated into the software development environment. The format was later used by independent users to create simple hypertexts before this concept was more popular. Hypertext capabilities however were limited, links between entries were only possibly by "see also" references at the end of each entry.

The concept of providing "information at your fingertips", as he called it, via a TSR program was a signature technology developed by Woodford in 1980 and used in other programs he created in that era including MathStar, WordFinder/SynonymFinder and a TEMPEST WWMCCS workstation developed for Systematics General Corporation. Warren's Guides, a.k.a. the Norton Guides, were the last application of this type written by Woodford.

Norton Guides were compiled from ASCII source files with a tool called NGC. Morten Elling wrote an alternative guides compiler NGX in 1994 or earlier.

== Editions ==
- Norton on-line programmer's guides. An on-line reference library of programming data. Version 1.0. 4 5-1/4" floppy disks. System requirements: IBM PC or compatible computer; 128K RAM; DOS 2.0 or higher; one disk drive.
