= Norton Confidential =

Norton Confidential is a program released in 2006 designed to encrypt passwords online and detect phishing sites.
