= Norton Personal Firewall =

- Norton Personal Firewall 2006
- Developer: Symantec
- Operating system: Microsoft Windows, Mac OS X
- Type: Personal firewall
- License: Proprietary
- Website: www.symantec.com/de/de/

Norton Personal Firewall, developed by Symantec, is a discontinued personal firewall with ad blocking, program control and privacy protection capabilities.

Norton Personal Firewall program control module is able to allow or deny individual applications access to the Internet. Programs are automatically allowed or denied Internet access by Norton Personal Firewall. It uses a blacklist and a whitelist to determine whether the program should be allowed Internet access.

The advertisement-blocking feature of this software rewrites the HTML that one's browser uses to display Web pages. It searches for code related to advertisements against a blacklist and prevents the web page from being displayed.

The Privacy Control component blocks browser cookies and active content, and prevents the transmission of sensitive data through standard POP3 e-mail clients, Microsoft Office e-mail attachments and Instant Messaging services such as MSN Messenger, Windows Messenger and AOL Instant Messenger without the user's consent.

== See also ==
- Internet Security
