= Kernel Patch Protection =

Security feature of Microsoft Windows

The kernel connects the application software to the hardware of a computer.

Kernel Patch Protection (KPP), informally known as PatchGuard, is a feature of 64-bit (x64) editions of Microsoft Windows that prevents patching the kernel. It was first introduced in 2005 with the x64 editions of Windows Vista and Windows Server 2003 Service Pack 1.

"Patching the kernel" refers to unsupported modification of the central component or kernel of the Windows operating system. Such modification has never been supported by Microsoft because, according to Microsoft, it can greatly reduce system security, reliability, and performance. Although Microsoft does not recommend it, it is possible to patch the kernel on x86 editions of Windows; however, with the x64 editions of Windows, Microsoft chose to implement additional protection and technical barriers to kernel patching.

Since patching the kernel is possible in 32-bit (x86) editions of Windows, several antivirus software developers use kernel patching to implement antivirus and other security services. These techniques will not work on computers running x64 editions of Windows. Because of this, Kernel Patch Protection resulted in antivirus makers having to redesign their software to not use kernel patching techniques.

However, because of the design of the Windows kernel, Kernel Patch Protection cannot completely prevent kernel patching. This has led to criticism that since KPP is an imperfect defense, the problems caused to antivirus vendors outweigh the benefits because authors of malicious software will simply find ways around its defenses. Nevertheless, Kernel Patch Protection can still prevent problems of system stability, reliability, and performance caused by legitimate software patching the kernel in unsupported ways.

== Technical overview ==
The Windows kernel is designed so that device drivers have the same privilege level as the kernel itself. Device drivers are expected to not modify or patch core system structures within the kernel. However, in x86 editions of Windows, Windows does not enforce this expectation. As a result, some x86 software, notably certain security and antivirus programs, were designed to perform needed tasks through loading drivers that modify core kernel structures.

In x64 editions of Windows, Microsoft began to enforce restrictions on what structures drivers can and cannot modify. Kernel Patch Protection is the technology that enforces these restrictions. It works by periodically checking to make sure that protected system structures in the kernel have not been modified. If a modification is detected, then Windows will initiate a bug check and shut down the system, with a blue screen and/or reboot. The corresponding bugcheck number is 0x109, the bugcheck code is CRITICAL_STRUCTURE_CORRUPTION. Prohibited modifications include:

- Modifying system service descriptor tables
- Modifying the interrupt descriptor table
- Modifying the global descriptor table
- Using kernel stacks not allocated by the kernel
- Modifying or patching code contained within the kernel itself, or the HAL or NDIS kernel libraries

Kernel Patch Protection only defends against device drivers modifying the kernel. It does not offer any protection against one device driver patching another.

Ultimately, since device drivers have the same privilege level as the kernel itself, it is impossible to completely prevent drivers from bypassing Kernel Patch Protection and then patching the kernel. KPP does however present a significant obstacle to successful kernel patching. With highly obfuscated code and misleading symbol names, KPP employs security through obscurity to hinder attempts to bypass it. Periodic updates to KPP also make it a "moving target", as bypass techniques that may work for a while are likely to break with the next update. Since its creation in 2005, Microsoft has so far released two major updates to KPP, each designed to break known bypass techniques in previous versions.

== Advantages ==
Patching the kernel has never been supported by Microsoft because it can cause a number of negative effects. Kernel Patch Protection protects against these negative effects, which include:

- Serious errors in the kernel.
- Reliability issues resulting from multiple programs attempting to patch the same parts of the kernel.
- Compromised system security.
- Rootkits can use kernel access to embed themselves in an operating system, becoming nearly impossible to remove.

Microsoft's Kernel Patch Protection FAQ further explains:

Because patching replaces kernel code with unknown, untested code, there is no way to assess the quality or impact of the third-party code...An examination of Online Crash Analysis (OCA) data at Microsoft shows that system crashes commonly result from both malicious and non-malicious software that patches the kernel.

— "Kernel Patch Protection: Frequently Asked Questions". Microsoft. 22 January 2007.

== Criticisms ==
=== Third-party applications ===
Some computer security software, such as McAfee's McAfee VirusScan and Symantec's Norton AntiVirus, worked by patching the kernel on x86 systems. Anti-virus software authored by Kaspersky Lab has been known to make extensive use of kernel code patching on x86 editions of Windows. This kind of antivirus software will not work on computers running x64 editions of Windows because of Kernel Patch Protection. Because of this, McAfee called for Microsoft to either remove KPP from Windows entirely or make exceptions for software made by "trusted companies" such as themselves.

Symantec's corporate antivirus software and Norton 2010 range and beyond worked on x64 editions of Windows despite KPP's restrictions, although with less ability to provide protection against zero-day malware. Antivirus software made by competitors ESET, Trend Micro, Grisoft AVG, avast!, Avira Anti-Vir and Sophos do not patch the kernel in default configurations, but may patch the kernel when features such as "advanced process protection" or "prevent unauthorized termination of processes" are enabled.

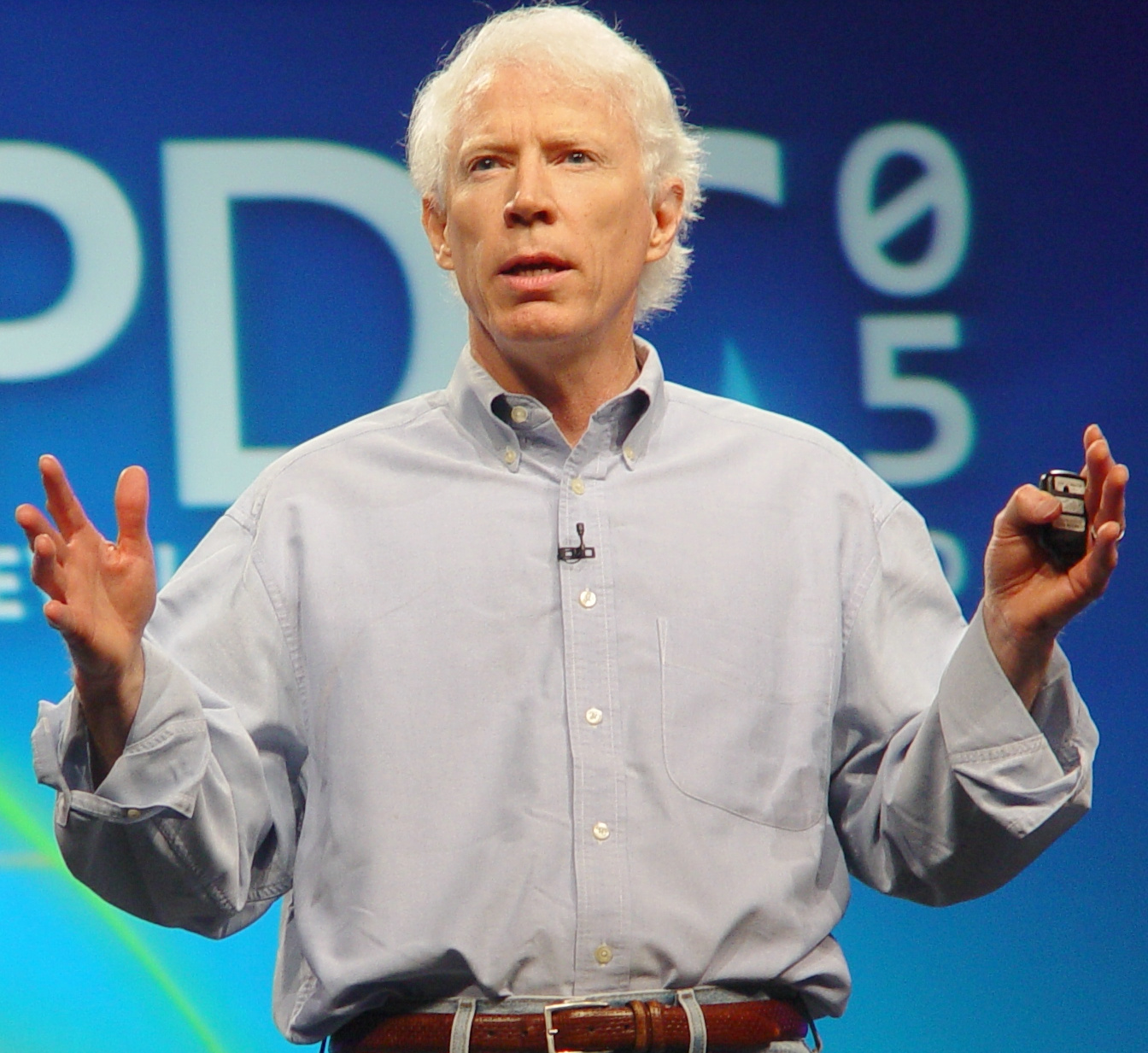
Jim Allchin, then co-president of Microsoft, was an adamant supporter of Kernel Patch Protection.

Microsoft does not weaken Kernel Patch Protection by making exceptions to it, though Microsoft has been known to relax its restrictions from time to time, such as for the benefit of hypervisor virtualization software. Instead, Microsoft worked with third-party companies to create new Application Programming Interfaces that help security software perform needed tasks without patching the kernel. These new interfaces were included in Windows Vista Service Pack 1.

=== Weaknesses ===
Because of the design of the Windows kernel, Kernel Patch Protection cannot completely prevent kernel patching. This led the computer security providers McAfee and Symantec to say that since KPP is an imperfect defense, the problems caused to security providers outweigh the benefits, because malicious software will simply find ways around KPP's defenses and third-party security software will have less freedom of action to defend the system.

In January 2006, security researchers known by the pseudonyms "skape" and "Skywing" published a report that describes methods, some theoretical, through which Kernel Patch Protection might be bypassed. Skywing went on to publish a second report in January 2007 on bypassing KPP version 2, and a third report in September 2007 on KPP version 3. Also, in October 2006 security company Authentium developed a working method to bypass KPP.

Nevertheless, Microsoft has stated that they are committed to remove any flaws that allow KPP to be bypassed as part of its standard Security Response Center process. In keeping with this statement, Microsoft has so far released two major updates to KPP, each designed to break known bypass techniques in previous versions.

=== Antitrust behavior ===
In 2006, the European Commission expressed concern over Kernel Patch Protection, saying it was anticompetitive. However, Microsoft's own antivirus product, Windows Live OneCare, had no special exception to KPP. Instead, Windows Live OneCare used (and had always used) methods other than patching the kernel to provide virus protection services. Still, for other reasons a x64 edition of Windows Live OneCare was not available until November 15, 2007.
