= Norton Power Eraser =

- Power Eraser, part of Norton Recovery Tools main screen
- Developer: Symantec Corporation
- Website: us.norton.com/support/tools/npe.html

Norton Power Eraser (NPE) is a discontinued small portable executable which uses Norton Insight in-the-cloud application ratings to scan a computer system. The program matches an application found on the user's computer with a list of trusted and malicious applications. If it's in the list of trusted applications, Power Eraser leaves it on the system. If it is in the list of bad applications, it is marked for deletion. If it is unknown and not in any list, it is reported as suspicious but not marked for removal. Instead, the program recommends a "remote scan", which will upload the file to Symantec's servers to check it with virus definitions.

In 2025, Norton announced Power Eraser was being retired and support would be discontinued effective April 30, 2026.

== Effectiveness ==
Power Eraser is very aggressive against unknown threats that are not whitelisted and are instead marked for removal or sent for analysis. The tool also features rootkit scanning, which requires a system restart. Threat removal is also performed after restart, on the next boot, to avoid the self-protection of viruses and trojans.
