= Norton LiveUpdate =

- LiveUpdate running in Norton Internet Security 2012
- Developer: Symantec Corporation
- Operating system: Microsoft Windows, Mac OS X
- License: Proprietary
- Website: Symantec.com

Norton LiveUpdate is a utility developed by Gen Digital (formerly Symantec Corporation and NortonLifeLock) that downloads and installs security updates and software patches for Norton products. LiveUpdate can only apply updates for a particular version of Norton; it cannot however upgrade a version of Norton to a later version (for example Norton Internet Security 2006 to 2009). To upgrade the product to the latest version, one would have to go to a separate website.

LiveUpdate first shipped in the 1997 version of Norton AntiVirus 2.0 and soon followed in other products. It was created by the Shared Technology Team at the company's Cupertino headquarters and later taken over by the Norton team. Symantec holds at least one patent related to LiveUpdate: Use of Polymorphic Package Files To Update Software.

== Usage ==
A valid subscription is required to use Symantec LiveUpdate. Symantec LiveUpdate can be run in Interactive Mode or in Express Mode. In Interactive mode, users decide which updates to download and apply. Express mode will download and apply all applicable updates. LiveUpdate also runs in Express mode silently in the background. Once all updates are downloaded, Symantec LiveUpdate will begin the process of installing them. If a restart is required, LiveUpdate will notify the user. Users can restart within the LiveUpdate interface.

Norton 2006 through 2008 products included a LiveUpdate Notice component, which notifies users of new product versions and subscription status.

== Intelligent Updater ==
Intelligent Updater is an alternate delivery method for virus definitions, which consists of an executable file that can be downloaded and run manually. It is used to update virus definitions only. To install other updates a user must run LiveUpdate.
