= Norton Security =

Computer security suite by NortonLifeLock

- Developer: NortonLifeLock
- Initial release: September 23, 2014; 11 years ago
- Stable release: 22.24.5.6 (Windows), 8.8.7 (Mac)
- Preview release: None [±]
- Operating system: Microsoft Windows, Mac OS X, Android, iOS
- Predecessor: Norton Internet Security
- Successor: Norton 360
- Type: Security suite
- License: Shareware
- Website: us.norton.com

Norton Security is a cross-platform security suite that provides subscription-based real-time malware prevention and removal in addition to identity theft protection and performance tuning tools. Other features include a personal firewall, email spam filtering, and phishing protection. It was released on September 23, 2014. In April 2019 it has been rebranded as Norton 360.

== Version history ==
In 2014, in an effort to streamline its Norton product line, Symantec combined nine standalone Norton products into one all-purpose suite. Norton Security superseded Norton Internet Security (and the pre-2019 versions of Norton 360), with an overlapping release cycle that saw version 22 as the initial release of the former and the final release of the latter. However, version 22 of Norton 360 and Norton Internet Security were updates as opposed to full releases.

In terms of similarities and differences with its predecessors, Norton Security retained all components of Norton Internet Security (including the antivirus, firewall and identity theft components) and added the optimization tools from Norton 360.

Norton Security is available in three editions: Norton Security Standard with one license (valid for a single device), Norton Security Deluxe with five licenses and Norton Security Premium which offers ten licenses, 25 GB of hosted online backup, and a premium subscription to Symantec's parental control system. All editions include protection for Windows, OS X, Android and iOS devices. However, features may vary based on the operating system.

In April 2019, the Norton 360 brand was reinstated as a replacement, maintaining a similar plan structure but with the addition of VPN and, on the premium tiers, LifeLock (which was acquired by Symantec in 2017).

== System requirements ==
- Operating Systems Supported (Norton Security 22.23.1.21 for Windows)
  - Microsoft Windows 10/11 (all but one version).
- Mac Operating Systems (Norton Security 8.8.3 for Mac)
  - macOS 11.0 or later. Older macOS Versions may get the latest virus definitions, but not the latest product updates.
- Android Operating Systems (Norton Mobile Security for Android was replaced by Norton360 Antivirus & Security)
- iOS Operating Systems (Norton Security for iOS was replaced by Norton360 Antivirus & Security)

== See also ==
- Norton 360
- SONAR
