= Norton 360 =

Computer security suite

- Developer: Gen Digital
- Operating system: Microsoft Windows, macOS, Android, iOS
- Predecessor: Norton Security
- Type: Antivirus software, Personal Firewall and backup
- License: Trialware
- Website: us.norton.com/products/norton-360

Norton 360 is an "all-in-one" security suite developed by Gen Digital (formerly Symantec, later NortonLifeLock). The product was originally introduced in 2006 and initially sold until 2014, when it was replaced by Norton Security. In 2019, the Norton 360 brand was revived as the successor to Norton Security, and the software continues to be sold today.

Norton 360 provides antivirus, malware, ransomware, and hacking protection; it also includes a password manager and online backup service. The software additionally provides scam detection for email, phone calls, SMS, and web browsing, including deepfake detection. In 2026, an AI agent safety tool was added, which prevents autonomous AI agents from accessing sensitive information or installing risky software without approval by the user.

== History ==
=== Initial launch of Norton 360 (2006–2014) ===
Norton 360
- Developer: Symantec
- Operating system: Windows XP (IA-32 only), Windows Vista, Windows 7, Windows 8 and Linux
- Platform: IA-32 and x64
- Type: Antivirus software, Personal Firewall and backup
- License: Trialware
- Website: us.norton.com/360 (archived)

The initial version of Norton 360 was an "all-in-one" security suite for the consumer market developed by Symantec (now Gen). Originally released in 2006, it was discontinued in 2014; its features were carried over to its successor, Norton Security, and then later to a revival of the Norton 360 brand.

==== Version history ====
===== Project Genesis =====
Symantec announced Project Genesis on February 7, 2006. Genesis would differ from Symantec's other consumer security products by incorporating file backup and performance optimization tools with antivirus capabilities and a firewall. Phishing protection and real-time heuristics were also planned. Windows Vista compatibility was a major aspect of Genesis. Genesis was slated for release in September 2006.

Genesis was renamed Norton 360 on May 31, 2006. Its feature set was confirmed—it would have the same functionalities as Norton Internet Security—with file backup, performance tools, phishing protection, and real-time heuristics. A public beta test was planned for summer 2006. The final release date was set at the end of 2006. The same day, McAfee announced Falcon, a security suite with similar functionalities as Norton 360 and OneCare.

Some viewed Norton 360 as a response to Microsoft's antivirus software, OneCare. Mark Bregman, Symantec's vice president, claimed the upcoming Norton 360 was not intended to compete with OneCare, stating "we somehow left the wrong impression in the market place that there's Windows Live OneCare from Microsoft, there's Falcon from McAfee, and there's nothing from Symantec."

The first public beta was delivered in November 2006, compatible with Windows XP. A second beta was subsequently released December 20, 2006, adding compatibility for Windows Vista. After 100,000 people tested the software, Symantec began distribution to retailers in February 2007.

===== Version 1.0 =====
Norton 360 version 1.0 box art

Version 1.0 was released on February 26, 2007. This version was the first Symantec product to use SONAR to detect zero-day viruses. It monitored applications for malicious behaviour, taking action as needed. The backup and restore functionality allowed users to back up files online or to a hard drive, CD, or DVD. Performance optimization tools allowed users to clear web browser history and temporary files. A disk defragmenter was bundled as part of the optimization tools. Phishing protection integrates with Internet Explorer, warning users of fraudulent sites.

Reviews cited Norton 360's low resource usage, relative to Norton Internet Security 2007, and phishing protection. PC Magazine found the phishing protection feature to be more effective at blocking access to fraudulent sites than Internet Explorer 7 and Firefox 2.

===== Version 2.0 =====
Version 2.0 was released March 3, 2008. The backup feature could now inscribe data to Blu-ray and HD DVD discs. Multiple installations of Norton 360 could also be managed from a centralized location. When backing up files online, the user could control the amount of bandwidth Norton used. A registry cleaner was bundled with the performance tools, allowing the user to remove invalid entries. Phishing protection for Firefox was added. Supplementing the phishing protection was the Norton Identity Safe, which stored login credentials to websites. A network map allowed users to view the status of other Norton installations on networked computers and view basic information about each computer.

===== Version 3.0 =====
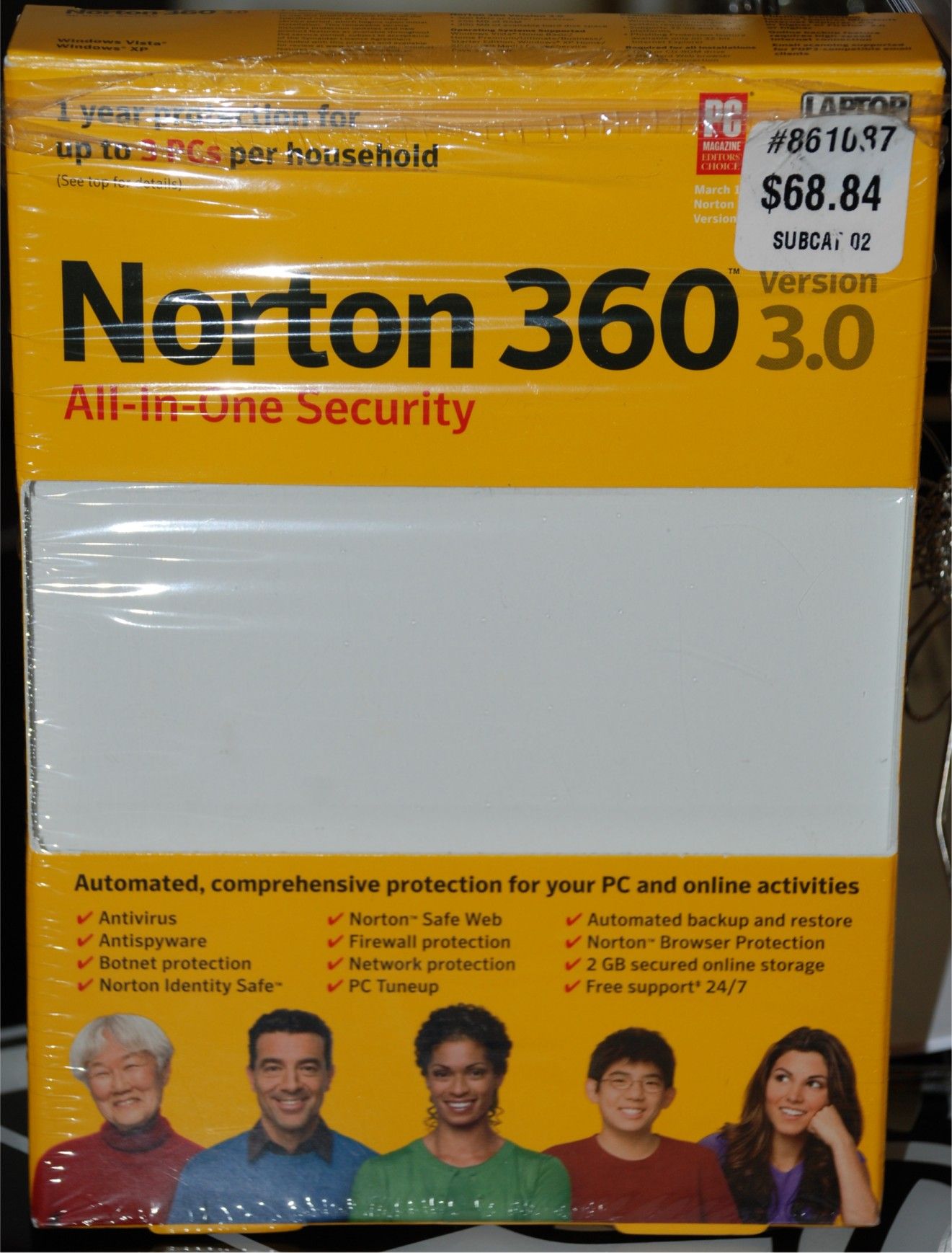
Norton 360 version 3.0 box art

Version 3.0 was released on March 4, 2009. This version used the same codebase as Norton Internet Security 2009. For earlier versions, Symantec rewrote code specifically for Norton 360.

Version 3.0 incorporated Norton Safe Web, offered as a standalone service earlier. Safe Web integrated with Firefox and Internet Explorer as a toolbar, blocking access to fraudulent and malware hosting sites. This toolbar also included a search box, routing search queries typed in the box through the Ask.com search engine. The toolbar does not share code with the Ask.com toolbar, which was classified as spyware by McAfee, Trend Micro, and other antivirus vendors. Due to criticism of the search functionality, Symantec announced the Ask.com search box would be hidden in future releases of version 3.0.

The capability to back up files to a flash drive was introduced in this release. Files stored on a flash drive could be copied to another computer without Norton 360 installed. Norton also created a virtual drive in Windows Explorer, allowing users to browse their backup files, stored locally or online. Users could restore individual files using the drag-and-drop technique. Version 3.0 did not retain previous versions of files and skips files which are open by another program. A startup application manager was included in this release, allowing users to control which programs start at login. To complement the application manager, Norton could measure the impact programs have on login time.

===== Version 4.0 =====
Version 4.0 was released on February 17, 2010. This version added many new security features found in Norton Internet Security 2010. Version 4 also featured a GUI change. The prominent colors now matched the gold and black sunburst of Norton Internet Security. The previous, criticized, anti-spam solution was replaced with Brightmail, which according to Symantec gives 20% better results and required no training.

===== Version 5.0 =====
Version 5.0 was released in February 2011 and offered improved performance and virus detection. It also provided updated versions of SONAR (version 3) and System insight. Download Insight now not only supports Internet Explorer and Firefox browsers only, but also supports the following clients: QQ (Chat), MSN Messenger (Chat), Limewire (P2P), MSN Explorer (Browser, E-mail & Chat), Opera (Browser), Outlook (E-mail), Thunderbird (E-mail), Windows Mail (E-mail), Chrome (Browser), BitTorrent (P2P), AOL (Browser), Yahoo Messenger (Chat), Safari (Browser), FileZilla (File Manager), Outlook Express (E-mail).

It featured a new and enhanced interface with more realistic icons and animations and it also included Norton Widgets - a platform that integrates other Symantec online services directly in the UI. Also new for this version were Reputation scan, that gives the user clear insight of the loaded applications and files and the Safeweb for Facebook, which scanned the links on their Facebook "wall" (predecessor to Feed) to verify their safety. Links to Norton Recovery Tools were added in the scanner's interface and in the start menu folder to help in restoring a highly infected system. The backup and restore functionality was also improved. Passmark performance test 011 rated Norton 360 5.0 as the fastest and lightest all-in-one suite.

===== Version 6.0 =====
Version 6.0 featured Metered Broadband modes, and allowed users to store logins and other personal info while protecting against online identity theft.

===== Versionless (unofficially 7.0 or 2013) 20.0 =====
This version of Norton was released on September 5, 2012, together with the newest Norton AntiVirus and Norton Internet Security products. It was described as "versionless" in Symantec's press release alluding to automatic updates that always kept the software to its latest version. The software was compatible with Windows 8. This version of Norton 360 featured enhancements in social networking protection, anti-scam capabilities, and stronger networking defenses. Norton also introduced the extra tune up disk optimizer.

===== Version 21 (2014) =====
Version 21 of Norton's security suite was released on September 4, 2013, together with the newest Norton Antivirus and Norton Internet Security products. Norton 360 is an antivirus solution developed on SONAR technology, which claims to be able to detect any threat, block it, and remove it, thanks to three out of five layers of shields: Threat Monitoring, Threat Removal, and Network Defense, the last one dealing with online threats before they can actually reach the user's computer. Protection was also granted through analyzing the behavior of known menaces.

===== Rebranding to Norton Security (version 22 (2015)) =====
The Norton Security brand was launched with Version 22, on September 22, 2014. This release was marketed as Norton Security 2015, however Norton 360 users were able to update to v22. The appearance of the software was similar to Norton Security 2015, with the "Norton Security" brand in the top-left corner.

=== Relaunch of Norton 360 (2019) ===
In April 2019, the Norton 360 brand was revived to replace Norton Security, adding Norton Secure VPN, 10 GB of online backup per-user, as well as premium plans incorporating LifeLock identity theft protection. Additional features have been added to the Norton 360 product line, including a specific suite of tools for gaming in 2021, and social media monitoring services in February 2022. In January 2022, Norton installed a cryptominer that would mine Ethereum once activated by the user; the feature was permanently disabled in September of that year.

In 2026, Norton added AI agent protection to Norton 360. The tool serves as a protection layer between autonomous AI agents and potentially sensitive information, by allowing users to review the actions of third-party AI agents before the agents are allowed to access sensitive information or execute sensitive commands.

== Editions ==
Norton 360 is available as Norton 360 Plus, Norton 360 Standard, Norton 360 Deluxe, and Norton 360 with LifeLock Select Plus.

Norton 360 is offered as a subscription service for a stated period (e.g. one year).

=== Mobile version ===
Gen Digital Inc. released a mobile Norton 360 application in 2021 on the App Store for iOS devices, and Google Play for Android devices.

== Issues and controversies ==
=== FBI cooperation ===
In 2001, Symantec, in compliance with the FBI, whitelisted Magic Lantern, a keylogger developed by the FBI. The purpose of Magic Lantern is to obtain passwords to encrypted e-mail as part of a criminal investigation. Magic Lantern was deployed as an e-mail attachment. When the attachment was opened, a trojan horse was installed on the suspect's computer. The trojan horse was activated when the suspect used PGP encryption, often used to increase the security of sent e-mail messages. When activated, the trojan horse logged the PGP password, which allowed the FBI to decrypt user communications. Symantec and other major antivirus vendors whitelisted Magic Lantern, rendering their antivirus products incapable of detecting Magic Lantern. Concerns included uncertainties about Magic Lantern's full potential and whether hackers could subvert it for purposes outside the jurisdiction of the law.

=== Uninstallation ===
Early 2000s versions of Norton Internet Security (Windows version) were criticized for not uninstalling completely, leaving unnecessary files and registry entries. Versions prior to 3.0 also installed a separate LiveUpdate program, which updates Norton-branded software. The user must uninstall both Norton Internet Security and the LiveUpdate component manually. The LiveUpdate component is purposely left behind to update other Norton-branded products, if present. Symantec has developed the Norton Removal Tool to remove registry keys and values along with files and folders. The uninstaller must be run twice: initially, then again after a computer restart, requiring a second restart. Uninstallation will not remove subscription data, which is preserved to prevent users from installing multiple trial copies.

=== Windows Service Packs ===
In 2008, users encountered incompatibilities upgrading to Windows XP Service Pack 3 or Windows Vista Service Pack 1 when Norton 360 version 2.0 was installed. Users report invalid Windows Registry keys being added by a tool named fixcss.exe, resulting in an empty Device Manager and missing devices such as wireless network adapters. To resolve the problem, Symantec issued a fix intended for users before upgrading. A tool to remove the added registry entries was available from Symantec.

=== Windows Vista ===
In 2008, Sarah Hicks, Symantec's vice president of consumer product management, voiced concern over Windows Vista 64-bit's PatchGuard feature. After negotiations and investigations from antitrust regulators, Microsoft decided to allow security vendors access to the kernel by creating special API instructions.

=== Subscription expiration ===
In 2010, a concern was raised that Norton 360 comes with a one-year subscription which is activated upon installation, and is valid for three home computers. Expiration of the subscription not only blocks access to program updates but shuts down the antivirus and the firewall as well.

== See also ==
- Norton AntiVirus
