= Selenka =

Selenka is a German surname, the German spelling of the Czech/Slovak surname Zelenka. Notable people with the surname include:

- Emil Selenka (1842–1902), German zoologist
- Margarethe Selenka (1860–1922), German zoologist, anthropologist, and feminist

== See also ==
- Selena (given name)
- Selenča, a village in Serbia
