= Ambrosius Hubrecht =

Dutch zoologist

Ambrosius Arnold Willem Hubrecht
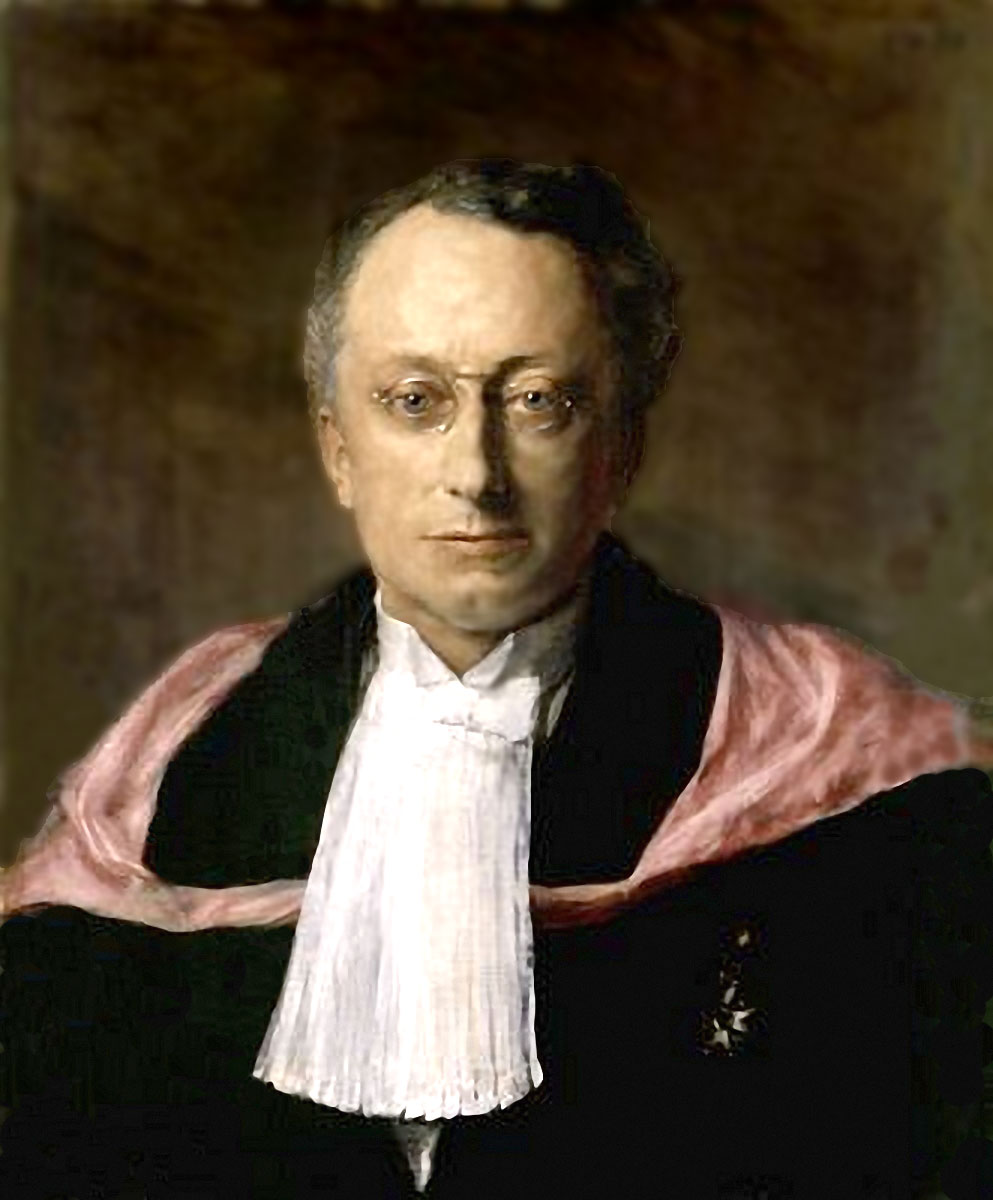
- Portrait by Bramine Hubrecht
- Born: 2 March 1853; Rotterdam
- Died: 21 March 1915 (aged 62); Utrecht
- Education: Utrecht University
- Spouses: Johanna Maria Molewater (m. 1878)
- Parents: Paul François Hubrecht (father); Maria Pruijs van der Hoeven (mother)
- Relatives: Bramine Hubrecht (sister); Franciscus Donders (brother-in-law); Abraham Pruijs van der Hoeven (uncle); Cornelis Pruijs van der Hoeven (grandfather); Gozewijn Jan Loncq (great uncle)
- Scientific career
- Fields: Biology; Zoology; Embryology
- Workplaces: Utrecht University
- Thesis: Aanteekingen over de anatomie, histologie en ontwikkelingsgeschiedenis van eenige Nemertinen (1874)
- Doctoral advisor: Pieter Harting
- Doctoral students: Hugo Frederik Nierstrasz

Ambrosius Arnold Willem Hubrecht (2 March 1853, in Rotterdam – 21 March 1915, in Utrecht) was a Dutch zoologist. Among his prominent contributions was the evolution of placental mammals. He coined numerous terms in embryology including the term trophoblast.

== Life and work ==
Hubrecht was born in Rotterdam, the son of banker Paul François and Maria Pruys van der Hoeven. His maternal grand uncle was Jan van der Hoeven. He studied zoology at Utrecht University with Harting and Donders, for periods joining Emil Selenka in Leiden and later Erlangen, and Carl Gegenbauer in Heidelberg. With Gegenbauer, he worked on the anatomy of Holocephali. He graduated magna cum laude with Harting in 1874 with a study on nemertine worms which are now treated as a phylum. Some of his work was done in Naples at the research station of Anton Dohrn. He then examined Thomas Huxley's works on comparative anatomy and began to study the insectivorous mammals. He then became interested in the evolution of viviparity. The term trophoblast was introduced by him while studying the embryo of the hedgehog. In 1875–1882 he worked at the Rijksmuseum van Natuurlijke Historie in Leiden, where he was the curator of ichthyology and herpetology, and in 1882 became professor at Utrecht. In 1890–1891 he traveled in Java, Sumatra, and Borneo, where he collected specimens and made embryological studies, notably on the tarsier, slow loris, pangolin, flying lemur (Galeopithecus) and treeshrew (Tupaia). He visited the United States in 1896 and 1907. Honorary degrees were conferred on him by Princeton University, the University of St Andrews, the University of Dublin, the University of Glasgow (LL.D 1901), and the University of Giessen. He resigned in 1910 and moved to the Institut Internationale d'Embryologie that he founded in 1911, today known as the International Society of Developmental Biologists. It holds many of his collections.

Hubrecht´s most important work was in embryology and placentation of the mammals and was based on a collection of embryos that he began making from early in his career. In papers in the Quarterly Journal of Microscopial Science in 1883 and 1887 he put forth the theory—also held by Sir E. Ray Lankester—that the vertebrates originated in a Nemertine form, basing this on his discovery in the Nemertines of a continuous nerve sheath. The Descent of the Primates (1897) is the title under which were published his lectures at the sesquicentennial celebration at Princeton.

In 1883 he became member of the Royal Netherlands Academy of Arts and Sciences. Hubrecht's sister Bramine (1855-1913) became a noted portrait artist. She was married to Franciscus Donders. She painted portraits of numerous faculty at the University of Utrecht including that of Hubrecht. Hubrecht married Marie daughter of Dr. G. B. Molewater of Rotterdam in 1880.
