= Webstar =

Webstar may refer to:

- DJ Webstar
- Kerio Technologies WebSTAR, an HTTP server for Classic Mac OS
