= Zelenka =

Zelenka (feminine: Zelenková) is a Czech and Slovak surname. The name stems from the adjective "zelený" (green). It may be either a nickname (e.g., "greenhorn") or an indication at the occupation of greengrocer. Notable people with the surname include:

== People ==
=== Zelenka ===
- Eric Zelenka, senior worldwide product marketing manager at Apple Inc.
- František Zelenka (1883–1944), Czech-Jewish functionalist architect
- Jan Dismas Zelenka (1679–1745), Czech baroque composer
- Jiří Zelenka (born 1972), Czech ice hockey player
- Joe Zelenka (born 1976), American National Football League player
- Karel Zelenka (born 1983), Italian figure skater
- Ladislav Zelenka, member of the Bohemian Quartet
- Luděk Zelenka (born 1973), Czech footballer
- Lukáš Zelenka (born 1979), Czech footballer
- Petr Zelenka (director) (born 1967), Czech film director
- Petr Zelenka (serial killer) (born 1976), Czech serial killer
- Sarah Zelenka (born 1987), American rower

=== Zelenková ===
- Lucie Zelenková (born 1974), Czech triathlete
- Marie Zelenková (fl. 1948), Czech table tennis player
- Olga Zelenkova (born 1967), Russian retired swimmer

== Fictional characters ==
- Radek Zelenka, Czech character in the TV series Stargate Atlantis, portrayed by David Nykl

== See also ==
- Zelenkov/Zelenkova, Russian surname
- Zelenko
