= Eric Zelenka =

Eric Zelenka is a Senior Worldwide Product Line Marketing Manager at Apple Inc. Prior to working at Apple, Zelenka worked for StarNine Technologies, Quarterdeck Office Systems (now part of Symantec Corporation), DoubleClick, and Mandala Communications.

== Background ==
In 1994 Zelenka started Macination Technologies to develop directory services and mail gateways for the classic Mac OS.

In June 1995, he joined StarNine Technologies in Berkeley, California. He was initially responsible for technical support for StarNine's Mail*Link gateways for Apple's PowerTalk and PowerShare collaborative solutions, MacHTTP, and WebSTAR. In 1996 he took the role of Product Manager and led the company's development of WebSTAR versions 2, 3 and 4.

In July 2000, he joined Apple as Product Line Manager for Mac OS X Worldwide Product Marketing. Zelenka has since worked on the initial public beta of Mac OS X, the release of Mac OS X Server, and various hardware and software initiatives including Xserve, Xsan, and Apple Remote Desktop. Zelenka currently manages Worldwide Product Marketing for Core OS software used by iOS, macOS, tvOS and watchOS. He manages Core OS technologies including UNIX, networking, IPv6, network file services, Mobile Device Management, Caching Server, and Apple File System.

== Notable mentions ==
At the 2004 Apple Worldwide Developers Conference, Steve Jobs mentioned Eric as having participated in the world's first in-air video conference using iChat AV. Eric Zelenka initiated the video conference while returning to San Francisco from Munich, using Lufthansa’s then-new high-speed wireless service.
