= AppleSearch =

- Developer(s): Apple Computer
- Stable release: 1.5.1 / 1994
- Operating system: Mac OS
- Type: Search engine
- License: Proprietary

AppleSearch was a client/server search engine from Apple Computer, first released for the classic Mac OS in 1994, being one of the first desktop search engines.

AppleSearch was a client/server application, although the vast majority of the logic was located in the server. The server portion periodically crawled a set of administrator-configured locations on hard drives, CD-ROMs and the network using AppleShare, indexing the documents it found after converting them to plain text using the Claris XTND document conversion system. A later version of the server, 1.5, could also be pointed at selected WAIS servers, using their indexes directly in addition to local ones. The same server also acted as a WAIS server, respond to WAIS requests sent to it over the internet. The server also offered a set of AppleEvents for use from Mac programs.

The server's query parser incorporated a number of features to help improve the ease-of-use of the query language. For instance, AppleSearch did not require the user to type in Boolean operators like AND or OR in their searches. While this is true for most search engines today, at the time this was a fairly uncommon feature. AppleSearch also supported stemming, which expanded search terms into similar words. Using stemming, a search on "pregnancy", for instance, would also find hits on "pregnant". Contractions, connecting words and punctuation were all handled as well.

Additionally, the search could be fed with the results of previous search in order to tune its results. For instance, if one searches on "turkey recipe", the first set of results might return a document on how to cook a turkey, but also one on middle-eastern cooking in Turkey. If the user then selected the document on cooking a turkey, they could then ask for more documents like that one. The engine would find key words in the document and use those as additional terms in the new search. This feature has since appeared in Google, under the Similar pages link.

AppleSearch also included the ability to summarize documents into a shorter form. It did this by selecting sentences from the document that contained a higher than normal number of key words, the key words being the same set that would be used for search tuning, as above. The user could request a version of the document some percentage of the original size, and the engine would then remove sentences it considered less important (those with less of the key words) until it reached the requested size.

The client portion was essentially a communications module that sent text-based requests to the server and received responses back. The client portion could be used within programs to integrate search capabilities with relative ease, the API was fairly small. Such applications were not common, instead, the client API was more commonly used as a gateway for internet software, including plug-ins for Gopher and web servers, notably MacHTTP and (later) WebSTAR. AppleSearch was also bundled with the Apple Internet Server Solution, a hardware/software bundle offered to create out of the box web servers based on the Apple Workgroup Servers.

AppleSearch was fairly resource heavy when it was released. It required a Mac using a 68040 and 5 MB of RAM as a minimum, which in 1994 was limited to Apple's higher-end offerings. Version 1.0.1, released in May 1994, added support for PowerPC-based machines as well. A basic install with the server and a five-user license cost $1,799, although this was reduced to $1,399 when version 1.5 was released. An additional ten users cost $499.

AppleSearch originated in the Advanced Technology Group (ATG), Apple's internal R&D labs. Prior to the release of AppleSearch, ATG had long been giving demos of the system using a client application known as Rosebud, which used the AppleSearch server to build a personalized newspaper.
