= Verhoef =

Verhoef is a Dutch toponymic surname. The name is a contraction of van der Hoef, meaning "from the homestead". Notable people with the surname include:

- Chris Verhoef (born 1962), Dutch computer scientist
- Esther Verhoef (born 1968), Dutch writer
- Maartje Verhoef (born 1997), Dutch fashion model
- Pieter Verhoef (1914–2013), South African theologian
- Schalk Verhoef (1935–1997), Dutch cyclist
- Toon Verhoef (born 1946), Dutch painter, ceramist and art lecturer

See also

- Verhoeff
- Verhoeven
