= Zeleneč =

Zeleneč may refer to:

- Zeleneč, Czech Republic
- Zeleneč, Slovakia
