= Norton Utilities version history =

Release history of Norton Utilities

Norton Utilities Ultimate (historically known as Norton Utilities) is a utility software suite sold by Gen. It was first released in 1982 as version 1.0 and continues to be released on an unversioned basis.

== Norton Utilities for DOS and Windows 3.1 ==
=== Version 1.0 ===
The initial 1982 release supported DOS 1.x and features the UNERASE utility. This allows files to be undeleted by restoring the first letter of the directory entry (a workaround of the FAT file system used in DOS). The UNERASE utility launched NU on its path to success. Peter Norton said

"Why did The Norton Utilities become such popular software? Well, industry wisdom has it that software becomes standard either by providing superior capabilities or by solving problems that were previously unsolvable. In 1982, when I sat down at my PC to write Unerase, I was solving a common problem to which there was no readily available solution."

14 programs were included, on three floppy disks, at a 1982 list price of $80 (equivalent to $267 in today's dollars):

- UnErase, recovers erased files
- FileFix, repairs damaged files
- DiskLook, complete floppy disk displays and maps
- SecMod, easy changes to floppy disk sectors
- FileHide, interactive hidden file control
- BatHide, automatic hidden file control
- TimeMark, displays date, time, elapsed time
- ScrAtr, sets DOS to work in any colors
- Reverse, work in black on white
- Clear, clears the screen for clarity
- FileSort, keeps floppy disk files by date or name
- DiskOpt, speeds floppy disk access
- Beep, causes the PC speaker to beep
- Print, prints files

=== Version 2.0 ===
The main feature of this DOS 2.x compatible version is FILEFIND, used for searching for files. This 1983 release adds hard disk support, and the PRINT program was renamed LPRINT to avoid conflict with the DOS command introduced in MS-DOS 2.0 as PRINT.COM. Following this release Norton became Utilities Editor of PC Magazine.

The executable files were compressed with Realia's Spacemaker.

=== Version 3.0 ===
This version, copyrighted 1984 but dated January 21, 1985, included Beep, Directory Sort, Disk Test, File Attributes, File Find, File Size, Line Print, List Directories, Screen Attributes, System Information, Text Search, Time Mark, Volume Label, Wipe Disk and Wipe File.

=== Version 3.1 ===
This 1986 version adds the Quick UnErase (QU) and Unremove Directory (UD) programs.

=== Version 4.0 ===
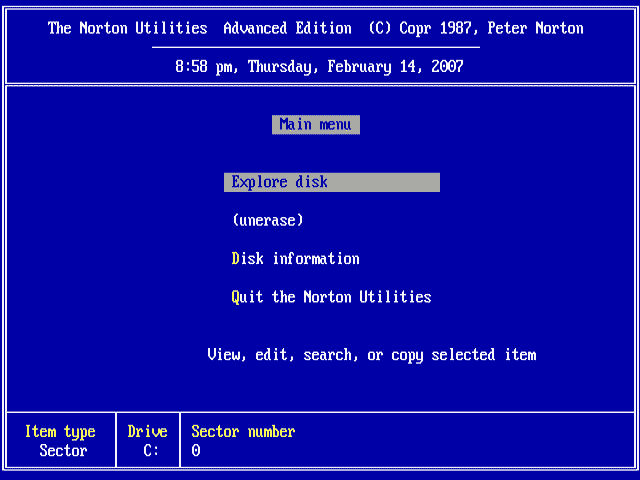
Norton Utilities 4.0 for DOS

Release 4.0 (1987, list $99.95) added four new programs:

- Ask, used for batch file programming
- File Info, add descriptions up to 65 characters long to each file
- Norton Change Directory, displays a graphic directory tree; change, remove, rename or make directories
- Norton Integrator, a menu system to tie the utilities together. Previously the utilities were accessed by typing the command name (usually a cryptic 2 character name such as FF) at the DOS prompt.

=== Version 4.0 Advanced Edition ===
This version (list $150), released simultaneously with 4.0 standard edition, is dated May 15, 1987. It adds Speed Disk, a disk defragmenter, and Format Recover.

=== Version 4.5 Advanced Edition ===
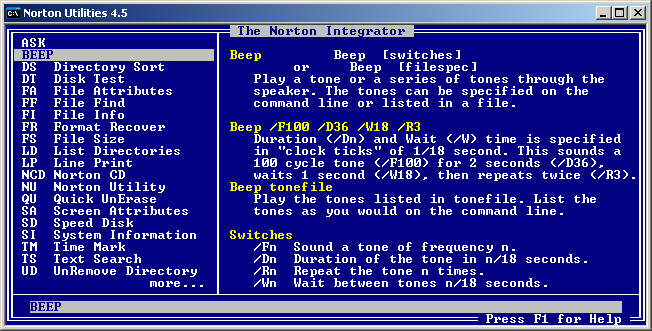
Norton Integrator from Norton Utilities 4.5 for DOS

Norton Disk Doctor is the major addition in this 1988 release. It also included Wipedisk; Wipefile, a Batch Enhancer and a sector level disk editor; a system information diagnostic utility and a disk caching program (NCACHE), which was between 10 - 50% faster than Microsoft's SMARTDrive when properly configured.

=== Version 5.0 ===
Release 5.0 adds new features, including Disk Editor, a utility to perform low level formatting on hard disks and changes such as password protection on the more "dangerous" utilities. It also includes a licensed version of the 4DOS replacement for COMMAND.COM called NDOS. This version also allows the choice of "classic" names (such as FF.EXE) or longer names (such as FINDFAST.EXE); these are configurable in the updated version of the Norton Integrator menu system.

=== Version 6.0 ===
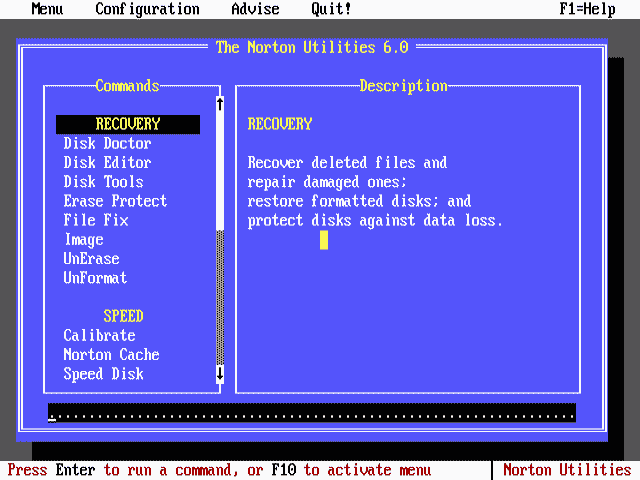
Norton Utilities 6.0 for DOS

Norton Utilities 6.0 supported DOS 5 and Windows 3.1. It included Windows Program Manager support, but the tools are still DOS-based, so a set of icons were supplied.

It includes Norton Disk Doctor, Disk Editor, Disk Tools, Speed Disk, Norton Cache, Disk Monitor, Diskreet, NDisk, System Information, NDOS.

Diskreet supports Data Encryption Standard.

System Information now includes more detailed information on installed system.

UnErase takes advantage of DOS 5.0's Delete Tracking and Mirror File features to recover data. However, MS-DOS 5.0 adds a new UNDELETE.exe program, licensed from Norton competitor Central Point Software, which takes advantage of the same Delete Sentry control and Deletion-tracking files. (The ERASE command is an alias for the DEL (Delete) command in the DOS command line). Windows 95's Recycle Bin soon further reduced the need for UnErase.

=== Version 7.0 ===
Release 7.0 supports MS-DOS 6.0, DoubleSpace, Stacker and SuperStor disk compression tools.

Tools includes Norton Disk Doctor, Disk Editor, Undelete, SmartCan, NDOS, System Information, File Find, Norton Change Directory.

Speed Disk remains as well, although SPEEDISK.exe was licensed by Microsoft and incorporated into MS-DOS as DEFRAG.exe in MS-DOS 6.0 onward.

Release 7.0 has revised user interfaces for the utilities that feature a menu-driven user interface. Also some of these tools now do not need to run in full-screen-mode but just display a window in the center of the screen, like the disk formatter or the disk duplicator utility.

Disk Editor now includes Advanced Recovery Mode.

=== Version 8.0 for DOS/Windows 3.x ===
Release 8.0 is nearly the same as 7.0, but adds Windows 3.1 utilities.

DOS Utilities include Norton Disk Doctor, System Information, Change Directory, FileFind, Diskreet, DUPDISK, File Fix, NDOS, Batch Enhancer, Norton Integrator, Speed Disk.

Windows utilities include Norton Disk Doctor, Speed Disk, System Watch, File Compare, INI Tracker, INI Tuner, INI editor, and INI Advisor.

== Norton Utilities for Windows 95 and later ==
=== Version 1.0 for Windows 95 ===
The original Windows 95 version was released in August 1995.

As a native Windows 95 tool, it supports the VFAT file system used by Windows 95.

It includes Norton Image, Norton System Doctor, Norton Protection, Rescue Disk, System Information, Norton Disk Doctor, Norton UnErase, Space Wizard, Speed Disk, System Information. DOS tools include Disk Editor, Disk Doctor, Pre-Installation TuneUp.

CD-ROM version was announced on 15 January 1996. It adds Disk Companion, Memory Companion and Norton Utilities Companion over floppy disk version.

Disk tools included with this release are not compatible with FAT32.

The Windows version of Speed Disk works with much greater speed than Microsoft's supplied defrag program, as it moved groups of clusters, not single clusters as Microsoft's Windows Disk Defragmenter. Changes in the way Windows operates meant that many of the old utilities were either dropped completely or replaced with GUI based versions. However, with the advent of Windows XP onwards, Norton's Speed Disk reverted to single-cluster defragmentation.

=== Version 2.0 for Windows 95 ===
Version 2.0 was announced on 7 October 1996. Version 2.0 features Norton CrashGuard with Anti-Freeze, Norton System Genie, Norton AntiVirus, LiveUpdate, System Genie, Registry Editor, System Doctor, System Benchmark, Disk Benchmark, Multimedia Benchmark, Speed Disk, Space Wizard.

Disk utilities now support FAT32.

A LiveUpdate fix was released for Norton Utilities 2.0 for Windows 95.

=== Version 2.0 for Windows NT 4.0 ===
Originally called Norton Utilities 2.0 for Windows NT during prerelease, it was announced on 27 January 1997.

It includes Norton Disk Doctor, Norton Speed Disk, Norton System Information, Norton System Doctor, Norton Protection/UnErase, Live Update.

Norton Disk Doctor, Speed Disk support FAT16 and NTFS file systems.

It does not include DOS UnErase, so files deleted from FAT partition needs to be handled by Norton Utilities for Windows 95/98.

=== Version 3.0 for Windows 95 ===
Officially announced on 10 November 1997, Norton Utilities 3.0 was the first version of to be included in Norton SystemWorks, it includes Norton WinDoctor, Norton Web Services, LiveUpdate Pro, Norton CrashGuard 3.0, Norton Zip Rescue, Norton System Doctor, Norton SpeedStart, Norton Optimization Wizard, Speed Disk.

Via the use of LiveUpdate, a Speed Disk patch is available to take advantage of Windows 98's application launch enhancements.

Symantec announced it had sponsored a bug-a-thon between USC and UCLA during the final development stages of the latest product release of Norton Utilities 3.0. The software began shipping on 21 November 1997.

=== Version 4.0 ===
Symantec announced version 4.0 on 16 February 1999.

Although the 'for Windows' name was dropped from the products, it still appears in support sites.

New additions include Windows 98 support, Norton SystemCheck, Registry Doctor Scan, Norton WinDoctor, Connection Doctor, Norton Wipe Info, Norton CrashGuard 4.0, Norton Zip Rescue, Norton Disk Doctor, Norton UnErase, a six-month subscription to Norton Web Services for $6.95.

On 13 May 1999, Symantec offered price reduction and rebates on Norton SystemWorks 2.0 and Norton Utilities 4.0.

Early order includes Net Nanny Internet filter software.

=== Release 2000 (Version 4.5) ===
With this release, Symantec changed the naming scheme to incorporate the year of release. Marketed as Norton Utilities 2000, this is the final version to run solely on the original Windows 95 platform.

It includes Norton Speed Disk, Norton System Check, Norton Disk Doctor, Norton Zip Rescue, free 3-month subscription to Norton Web Services.

=== Release 2001 (Version 5.0) ===
Announced on 29 August 2000, the 2001 edition supports Windows 95, 98, ME, Windows NT and Windows 2000.

It includes Norton Speed Disk, Norton Optimization Wizard, Norton Disk Doctor, Norton WinDoctor, Norton System Doctor, and Norton System Check.

Disk tools now supports USB and FireWire drives.

This is the final version to run solely on the later versions of Windows 95 platform.

=== Release 2002 (Version 6.0) ===
In anticipation of major changes to the Norton product lineup, no new features were introduced in this release.

NU 2002 introduced Windows XP compatibility while dropping support for Windows 95.

Utilities include Norton Speed Disk, Norton System Doctor, Norton UnErase, Norton Disk Doctor, Norton WinDoctor, System Information and Wipe Info.

This is the final version to run solely on the Windows 9x platform.

=== Release 2003 ===
For the next six years, Norton Utilities ceased to exist as standalone product, instead becoming part of Norton SystemWorks starting 2003. SystemWorks is essentially several Symantec software bundled together in one package.

=== Release 2004 ===
It is only included with Norton SystemWorks 2004.

=== Release 2005 ===
It is only included with Norton SystemWorks 2005.

It supports Windows 98 or higher.

It includes Norton Protection, Speed Disk, Norton Optimization Wizard, Norton System Doctor, UnErase Wizard, Norton Disk Doctor, Norton WinDoctor, System Information, Wipe Info, Image, Norton File Compare, Norton Registry Editor, Norton Registry Tracker, and Explorer Shell Extension.

=== Release 2007 ===
It is only included with Norton SystemWorks 2007.

=== Version 14.0 ===
The revival of Norton Utilities as standalone software was announced on 3 February 2009, along with the discontinuation of Norton SystemWorks, which it replaces as Symantec's flagship PC tune-up suite.

This version adds 64-bit support on Windows XP and Vista. It includes Registry Defragmenter, Registry Cleaners, Disk Cleaner, Disk Defragmenter, Startup Manager, Service Manager, Restore Center, System Optimizer, Process Viewer, and Performance Test.

The product license was changed to allow the software to be installed on up to three household PCs.

In October 2009, Symantec also released a version of Norton Utilities which is called Norton Utilities Premier Edition. It had all features of Norton Utilities plus Norton Online Backup and was compatible with Windows 7.

=== Version 15.0 ===
Norton Utilities 15.0 includes features from the discontinued Norton SystemWorks. It includes Norton Speed Disk, Norton Disk Doctor, Norton UnErase, Registry Restore, Registry Defragmenter, Registry Cleaner, Disk Cleaner, Disk Defragmenter, Startup Manager, Service Manager, Restore Center, System Optimizer, Process Viewer, and Performance Test. This version also includes a new GUI.

=== Version 16.0 ===
Norton Utilities 16.0 includes features from Norton SystemWorks. It includes Application Uninstaller, Norton Speed Disk, Norton Disk Doctor, Norton UnErase, Registry Restore, Registry Defragmenter, Registry Cleaner, Disk Cleaner, Duplicate File Finder, Disk Defragmenter, Startup Manager, Service Manager, Restore Center, System Optimizer, System Dashboard, Process Viewer, Performance Test and Smart Updates.

New features include Duplicate File Finder, System Dashboard, Application Uninstaller, Windows 8 Compatibility.

== Norton Utilities for Macintosh ==
Norton Utilities for Macintosh was a separate utility suite for the Mac OS, providing much of the same features as the equivalent Windows version.

=== Version 1.0 ===
Originally released in 1990, requiring a Mac Plus with 1 MB of system memory.

The includes disk tools support the HFS file system only. Support for the Apple Hard Disk 20 is not explicitly mentioned.

When Apple released System 7, Norton Utilities for the Macintosh needed to be updated in order to run safely. This proved to be a recurring story in the history of the utility; early versions were highly regarded for a while, but proved to be hazardous when used with newer disk structures and operating systems before being updated.

=== Version 2.0 ===
Originally released in 1992.

It includes Disk Editor, Norton Backup for Macintosh. It also added features in Symantec Utilities for Macintosh II.

=== Version 3.x ===
3.0 was originally released in August 1994. It supports PowerPC but Speed Disk 3.0 can cause data loss.

- Version 3.1 was released in September 1994, correcting problems with Speed Disk

=== Version 3.2 ===
Released in October 1995, v3.2 adds support for volumes larger than 4 GB, up to 2 TB to match System 7.5.2 disk size limit.

This edition was bundled with new Small Business Macintosh 6500/250 and 4400/200.

- Version 3.2.1 Update from 3.2
- Version 3.2.3 Update from 3.2.x
- Version 3.2.4 Update from 3.2.x fix for Mac OS 7.6

=== Version 3.5 ===
Announced on 12 May 1997, v3.5 is the first version of Norton Utilities for Macintosh to ship on CD-ROM. This version supports Macs with Motorola 68020-68040 processors and G3 PowerMacs running Mac OS 7.1-8.6.

It includes Norton CrashGuard, Speed Disk, Norton Disk Doctor, Disk Editor, FileSaver, UnErase, Volume Recover, Wipe Info, System Info, Disk Light, FastFind.

Norton CrashGuard replaces Norton Fastback and Floppier.

- Update 3.5.1 released in July 1997, adds Mac OS 8 support.
- Update 3.5.2 released in November 1997 on bootable CD-ROM, improves support of HFS+ file system.
- Update 3.5.3 released in January 1998 is the last version to support 68K Macs.

=== Version 4.0 ===
Announced on 14 September 1998. For the first time, Norton Utilities can run natively on PowerPC Mac computers. Version 4.0 is compatible with PowerPC Macs (up to G3) running Mac OS 7.5 and above (up to 8.6) and adds Mac OS Extended Format (HFS+) file system support.

Features include Norton Disk Doctor, File Saver, UnErase, and Volume Recover, Norton CrashGuard.

- Version 4.0.1 released October 1998
- Version 4.0.2 released December 1998
- Version 4.0.3 released February 1999
- Version 4.0.4 released June 1999

=== Version 5.0 ===
Announced on 21 July 1999, v5.0 is compatible with PowerPC G3 and G4 Macs running Mac OS 8.0-9.1.

An update was available to make the software compatible with Mac OS 9.

- Version 5.0.2 released November 1999, was released to correct an issue with FileSaver and issues with the invisible FileSaver data files
- Version 5.0.3 released June 2000, addresses further early iBook issues and DiskLight

=== Version 6.0 ===
Announced on 25 October 2000, v6.0 supports PowerPC Macs running Mac OS 8.1 and above.

Major features include Norton FileSaver and Speed Disk.

- Version 6.0.2 released June 2001
- Version 6.0.3 released October 2001
- Version 6.0.4 latest 6.0 version that supports Mac OS (Mac OS 8.1 through 9.2.2)

=== Version 7.0 ===
Version 7.0 runs on Mac OS 8 and OS 9, and added Mac OS X support. Mac OS X tools run on PowerPC G3 Mac (except Beige G3). However, the Mac OS X tools have not been tested on Mac OS X later than 10.2.6, and is known to be incompatible with Mac OS X 10.3 (Panther).

Features: Norton Disk Doctor, Speed Disk, FileSaver, UnErase, Volume Recover, LiveUpdate.

Speed Disk does not run on Mac OS X, except by booting with Norton Utilities 7.0 CD.

=== Version 8.0 ===
The package of v8.0 is simply labeled 'Norton Utilities 8.0', but it was called Norton Utilities for Macintosh 8.0 in support pages.

All Mac OS X tools now run natively, but the CD can still boot into Mac OS 9.

It includes Wipe Info, Speed Disk, Volume Recover, Norton FileSaver, UnErase, LiveUpdate.

8.0.1 adds support of Mac OS X 10.3.

8.0.2 adds support of G5 model Macintosh released before December 2004, 1.25 GHz eMac, and various Mac G4 notebooks. However, some tools may present errors when running Mac OS X 10.4 (Tiger).

=== End of life ===
In 2004, Symantec confirmed it had stopped developing Norton Utilities for Macintosh and Norton SystemWorks for Macintosh, and concentrated its efforts solely on Internet security products for the Mac.

== Symantec Utilities for Macintosh ==
Symantec Utilities for Macintosh (SUM) is a set of system utilities from Symantec, developed before Symantec had acquired Peter Norton Computing. SUM started out as a revised version of the MacZap data recovery tools and includes utilities for data recovery, disk partitioning, disk defragmentation, and floppy disk duplication, among others. Later SUM tools may have shared code with Norton Utilities for Macintosh. Some of the functionality from SUM II was incorporated into Norton Utilities 2.0.

SUM v1.1 was published in 1988 and requires a Mac 512Ke or later system. This version also has limited support for MFS-formatted floppy disks.

SUM II was announced for release in August 1989 and includes tools for data backup and data encryption. SUM II v2.0 runs on Macs with System 4.2 or higher and 1 MB of memory. One review mentioned that it is easy to make use of most of SUM II's utilities, but at the same time, the file recovery functionality in SUM II is less automated and required more manual configuration compared to the file recovery functionality in Norton Utilities. In September 1991, version 2.1 of SUM II, which would support System 7, was announced.

== Norton Utilities for Unix ==
In 1990, Segue Software developed a Unix version of Norton Utilities, in cooperation with Peter Norton Computing and INTERACTIVE Systems Corp. Interactive Systems stopped marketing the software in 1992. In February 1994, AlmondSeed Software, Inc. licensed the software and released it as "The Almond Utilities for UNIX". AlmondSeed Software released the Utilities for SCO UNIX and Sun Solaris.
