= Van der Hoeven =

Van der Hoeven (Vanderhoeven) or Van der Hoeve is a surname of noble Dutch family. People with the name include:

- Abraham Pruijs van der Hoeven (1829–1907), Dutch colonial governor of Aceh
- Agnes van Ardenne-van der Hoeven (b. 1950), Dutch politician
- nl:Cees van der Hoeven (b. 1947), Dutch businessman, CEO of Ahold from 1993 to 2003
- de:Cornelis van der Hoeven (1792–1871), Dutch physician
- Jan van der Hoeve (1878–1952), Dutch ophthalmologist
- Jan van der Hoeven (1801–1868), Dutch zoologist and author
- Joris van der Hoeven (b. 1971), Dutch mathematician and computer scientist
- Maria van der Hoeven (b. 1949), Dutch politician and government minister
- Mirna van der Hoeven (b. 1944), Dutch sprinter
- Rolph van der Hoeven (b. 1948), Dutch Economist
- Willem van der Hoeven (b. 1944), Dutch businessman and football club manager

== See also ==
- Verhoeven
