= HiJaak =

HiJaak is an image manager, graphics converter and screen capture computer program from IMSI/Design. It can also be used for batch editing.

== History ==
HiJaak began as a screen capture and graphics conversion tool for MS-DOS from Inset Systems of Brookfield, Connecticut. At the time of the release of version 2.0 in December 1990, the program was capable of converting between more than 36 different graphics file formats. HiJaak was converted from 16-bit DOS to run on 32-bit Windows 95 in 1995. HiJaak Pro version 5 can handle more than 115 raster and vector graphics file formats. HiJaak allows the user to capture small selections on the screen.

Inset Systems was acquired by Quarterdeck Corporation in exchange for 993,000 shares of Quarterdeck common stock in September 1995. In 1998, after the MS-DOS market collapsed, Quarterdeck was acquired by Symantec. At some time between 1998 and 2000, Symantec sold HiJaak to International Microcomputer Software, Inc. (IMSI), of Novato, California, who then incorporated it into their business products line.

IMSI/Design, LLC, the current owner of HiJaak, also produces TurboCAD.
