= Zeleneč, Czech Republic =

Zeleneč
- Municipality
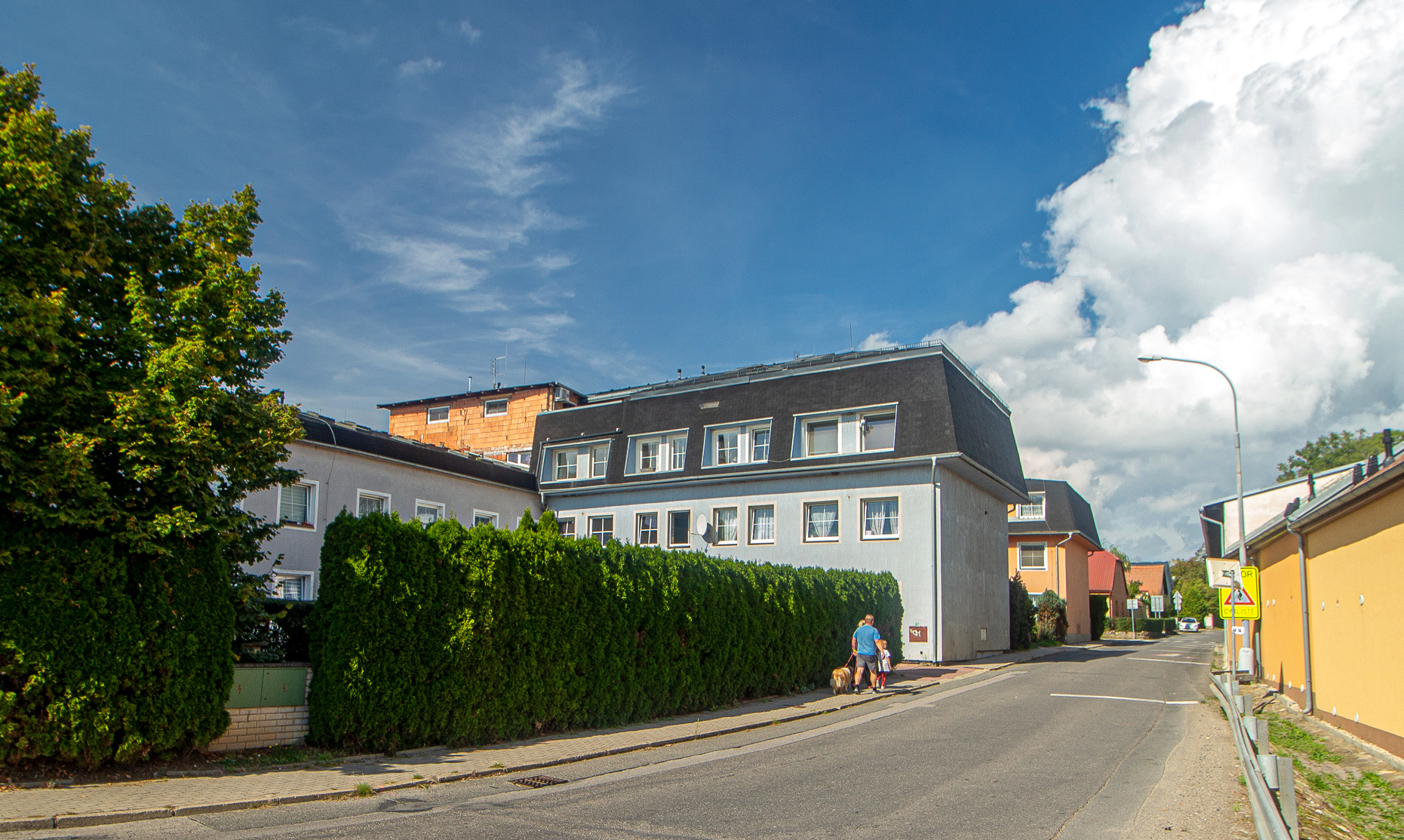
- Centre of Zeleneč

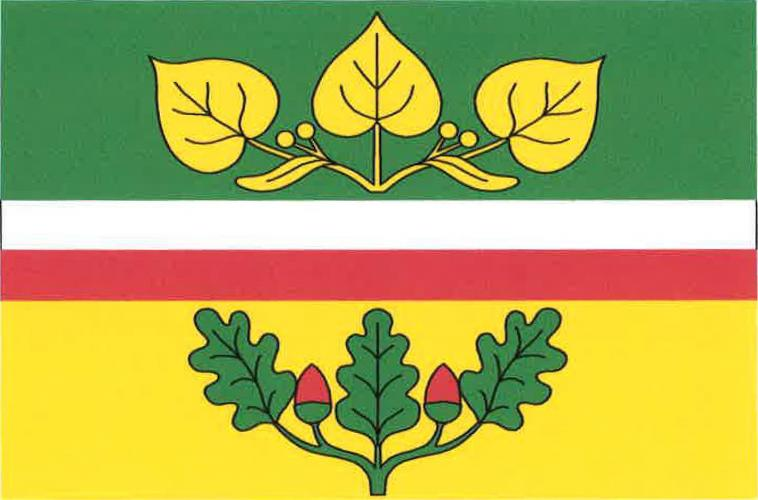
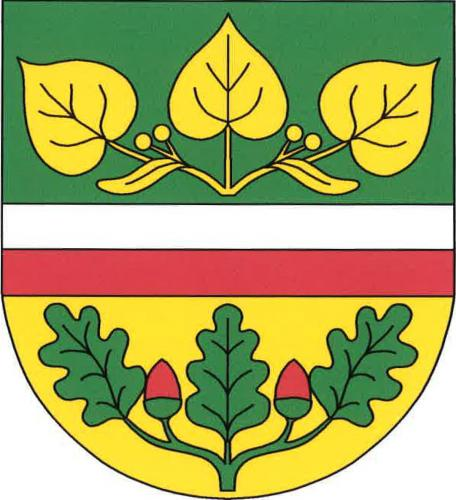
- Flag Coat of arms

- Location in the Czech Republic
- Coordinates: 50°8′1″N 14°39′39″E
- Country: Czech Republic
- Region: Central Bohemian
- District: Prague-East
- First mentioned: 1378

Area
  - Total: 10.75 km^{2} (4.15 sq mi)
- Elevation: 255 m (837 ft)

Population (2026-01-01)
  - Total: 3,197
  - Density: 297.4/km^{2} (770.3/sq mi)
- Time zone: UTC+1 (CET)
  - Summer (DST): UTC+2 (CEST)
- Postal code: 250 91
- Website: www.zelenec.cz

Zeleneč (Czech pronunciation: [ˈzɛlɛnɛtʃ]) is a municipality and village in Prague-East District in the Central Bohemian Region of the Czech Republic. It has about 3,200 inhabitants.

== Administrative division ==
Zeleneč consists of two municipal parts (in brackets population according to the 2021 census):

- Zeleneč (3,128)
- Mstětice (39)

== Etymology ==
The name is derived from the personal name Zelenec or Zelenka.

== Geography ==
Zeleneč is located about 10 kilometres (6 mi) east of Prague. It lies in a flat agricultural landscape in the Central Elbe Table, in the Polabí lowlands.

== History ==
The first written mention of Zeleneč is in a document created in 1372–1378. The record of Kašpar of Zeleneč from 1316, which is sometimes cited as the first mention, actually dates from 1416.

== Demographics ==
Historical population

Year	Pop.	±%
1869	680	—
1880	806	+18.5%
1890	775	−3.8%
1900	767	−1.0%
1910	852	+11.1%

Year	Pop.	±%
1921	866	+1.6%
1930	1,526	+76.2%
1950	1,660	+8.8%
1961	1,761	+6.1%
1970	1,631	−7.4%

Year	Pop.	±%
1980	1,463	−10.3%
1991	1,361	−7.0%
2001	1,383	+1.6%
2011	2,984	+115.8%
2021	3,167	+6.1%

Source: Censuses

== Transport ==
There is no major road running through the municipal territory, but Zeleneč is located in close proximity to the D10 motorway, which runs north of it, and the D11 motorway to the south.

Zeleneč is located on the railway line Prague–Lysá nad Labem, further continuing to Kolín or to Milovice.

== Sights ==
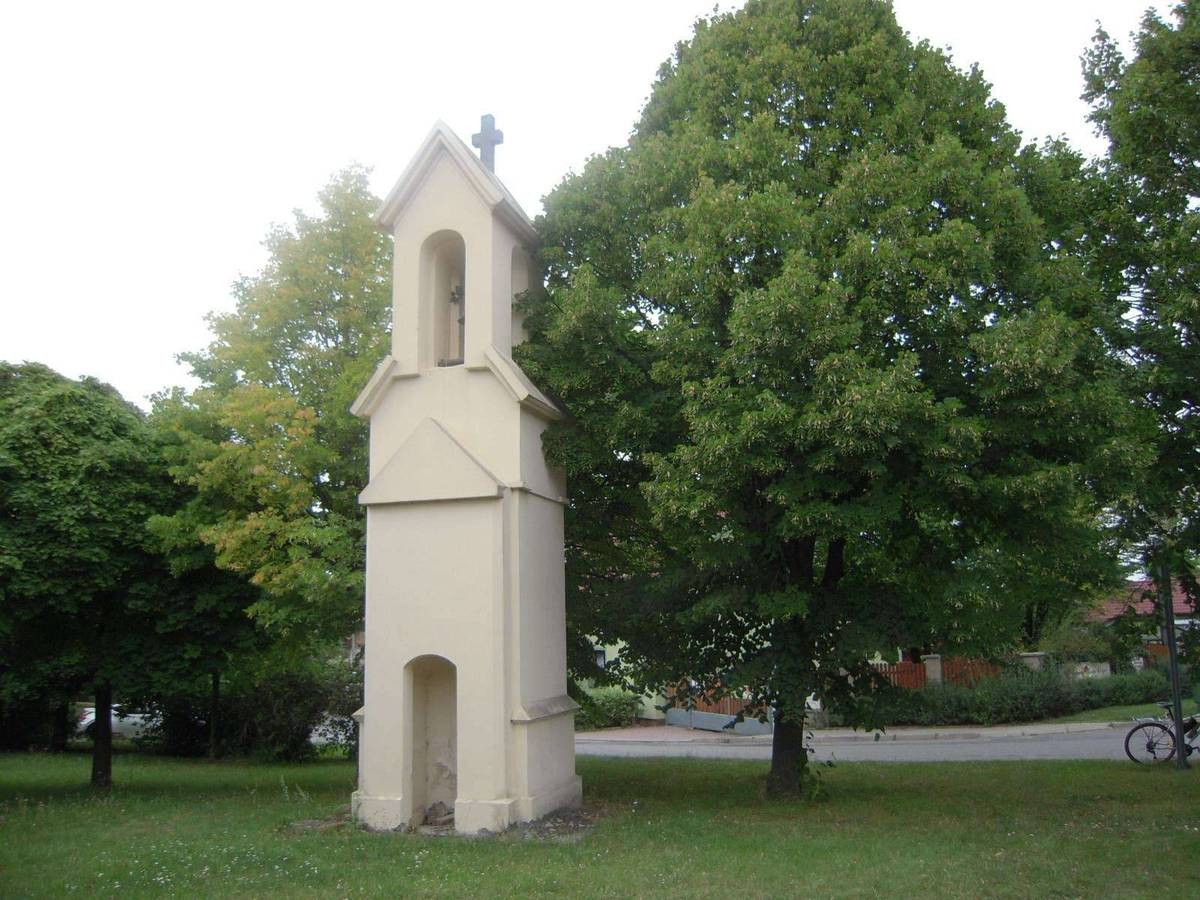
Chapel

The only protected cultural monuments in the municipality are a niche chapel with a statue of St. John of Nepomuk, which dates from 1863, and a stone cross from 1820.
