= GoBack =

Data-backup and version-control software from Symantec

Norton GoBack (previously WildFile GoBack, Adaptec GoBack, and Roxio GoBack) is a disk utility for Microsoft Windows that can record up to 8 GB of disk changes. When the filesystem is idle for a few seconds, it marks these as "safe points". The product allows the disk drive to be restored to any point within the available history. It also allows older versions of files to be restored, and previous versions of the whole disk to be browsed. Depending on disk activity, the typical history might cover a few hours to a few days.

== Operation ==
GoBack replaces the master boot record, and also replaces the partition table with a single partition. This allows a hard drive to be changed back, even in the event that the operating system is unable to boot, while also protecting the filesystem from alteration so that the revert information remains correct.

GoBack is compatible with hardware RAID drives.

== Incompatible products ==
Due to the changes made to the partition table, this can cause problems when dual booting other operating systems on the same hard disk. It is possible to retain dual-boot compatibility, but can involve saving the partition table before enabling GoBack, and after enabling GoBack, re-writing the partition table back to the disk (after booting from a different device, such as a Live CD).

It may also be necessary to disable GoBack prior to using certain low level disk utilities, such as formatting software. Such low level utilities which do not first check for the presence of GoBack can (in combination with GoBack) cause data to become corrupted. Another example of an incompatible program is the Windows version of True Image For Windows. GoBack is also incompatible with products such as Drive Vaccine PC Restore and RollBack Rx - as these products require access to the master boot record.

== Usage precaution ==
- Several users at CNET Reviews have reported data loss after installing this product. CNET gave Norton GoBack 4.0 an editors' rating of 3.5 out of five stars, but the average user rating was only 1.5 stars.
- Norton GoBack 4.0 does not support hard drive partitions of 1 TB or higher.
- As per Symantec, Norton GoBack 4.0 is not compatible with Windows Vista.

== Product history ==
- GoBack was designed by Wild File, Inc., a company located in Plymouth, Minnesota. The software was shown at COMDEX in November 1998 and released in December 1998. A patent for the technology was issued in January 2000.
- March 2000: Adaptec, Inc., acquires Wild File for approximately $29 million.
- April 2001: Adaptec creates spin-off company, Roxio, Inc., which retains the GoBack product.
- May 2001: Roxio GoBack 3 Deluxe is released, this time also supporting the NTFS filesystem, which by now was being used more widely since the release of Windows XP.
- August 2001: Symantec Corp. announces Norton SystemWorks 2002 which includes GoBack 3 Personal Edition by Roxio.
- April 2003: Roxio sells GoBack to Symantec for $13 million.
- September 2004: Norton GoBack 4.0 is released by Symantec and included in Norton SystemWorks 2005.
- November 2007: Symantec releases a Vista-compatible version of Norton SystemWorks for 2008 (11.0) which no longer contains GoBack, but the Premier Edition of SystemWorks now includes Norton Save & Restore 2.0.
- March 2009: As per Symantec, Norton GoBack has been replaced by Norton Ghost 14 (Norton Ghost however is missing some functions that Norton Goback had).

== Awards ==
- May 2000: Adaptec GoBack 2.1 receives PC Magazine Editors' Choice Award.
- June 2003: GoBack 3 Deluxe receives PC Magazine Editors' Choice Award.
- June 2004: Norton GoBack 3.0 receives PC Magazine Editors' Choice Award.
- August 2005: Norton GoBack 4.0 receives PC Magazine Editors' Choice Award.

== Competing products ==
- Windows SteadyState (discontinued)

== See also ==
- Data recovery
