= Verhoeff =

Verhoeff is a surname. Notable people with the surname include:

- Frederick Herman Verhoeff (1874–1968), American ophthalmic surgeon who developed Verhoeff's stain
- Hendrik Verhoeff (c. 1645–1680), Dutch silversmith and assassin
- Jacobus Verhoeff (1927–2018), Dutch mathematician
- John M. Verhoeff, of the Peary expedition to Greenland of 1891–92
- Karl Wilhelm Verhoeff (1867–1944), German zoologist
- Keaton Verhoeff (born 2008), Canadian ice hockey player
- Pieter Verhoeff (1938–2019), Dutch film director
- Pieter Willemsz. Verhoeff (c. 1573–1609), Dutch captain of the Admiralty of Amsterdam

== See also ==
- Verhoeff algorithm, a check digit algorithm invented by Jacobus Verhoeff
- Verhoef, a related surname
- Verhoeven
