= WebSTAR =

WebSTAR was a web server application for the classic Mac OS. It supported the common gateway interface (CGI) and its own AppleEvents-based W*API for plug-in support, as well as SSL and similar technologies used in most early web servers. Unlike most servers of the era, WebSTAR was very Mac-like in terms of installation and maintenance, using a number of AppleEvents-based MacOS programs for most tasks. WebSTAR was also part of Apple's Internet Server Solution, a package of internet server software and certain models of PowerMac machines. One popular use of WebSTAR was in combination with FileMaker to make simple database-driven online applications.

The product traces its roots to the earlier MacHTTP, released as shareware by Chuck Shotton in 1993. StarNine licensed MacHTTP and released the greatly upgraded WebSTAR in 1995. StarNine was purchased by Quarterdeck Office Systems shortly after the release, and along with many upgrades to WebSTAR the company also released Quarterdeck Mail for the Mac, and a little-known Microsoft Windows version of WebSTAR that quickly disappeared. Quarterdeck sold the entire StarNine division to a holding company in 1998, who sold it in turn to ACI in 2000. They released a Carbon version for Mac OS X in 2001, which added the ability to directly run Unix-based CGIs.

After several more releases, ACI (now known as 4D Inc.) sold the line to Kerio Technologies in 2006. The entire line is now dormant.
