= War at the Wall Street Journal =

- Author: Sarah Ellison
- Publisher: Houghton Mifflin Harcourt
- Publication date: May 12, 2010
- Pages: 274

War at the Wall Street Journal is the first book released by author and journalist Sarah Ellison, published on May 12, 2010. The book is an account of Rupert Murdoch's purchase of the Wall Street Journal from the Bancroft family in 2007. Ellison, a former Journal reporter, was at the paper during the takeover.

== Reception ==
War at the Wall Street Journal was met with mostly positive reviews. It was profiled in the New York Times, the Washington Post, Financial Times, Publishers Weekly, Booklist, and others. Ellison was particularly praised for her storytelling style, with The New York Times saying that the book was a "definitive, indeed cinematic, account."
