= Jesse Eisinger =

American journalist and author

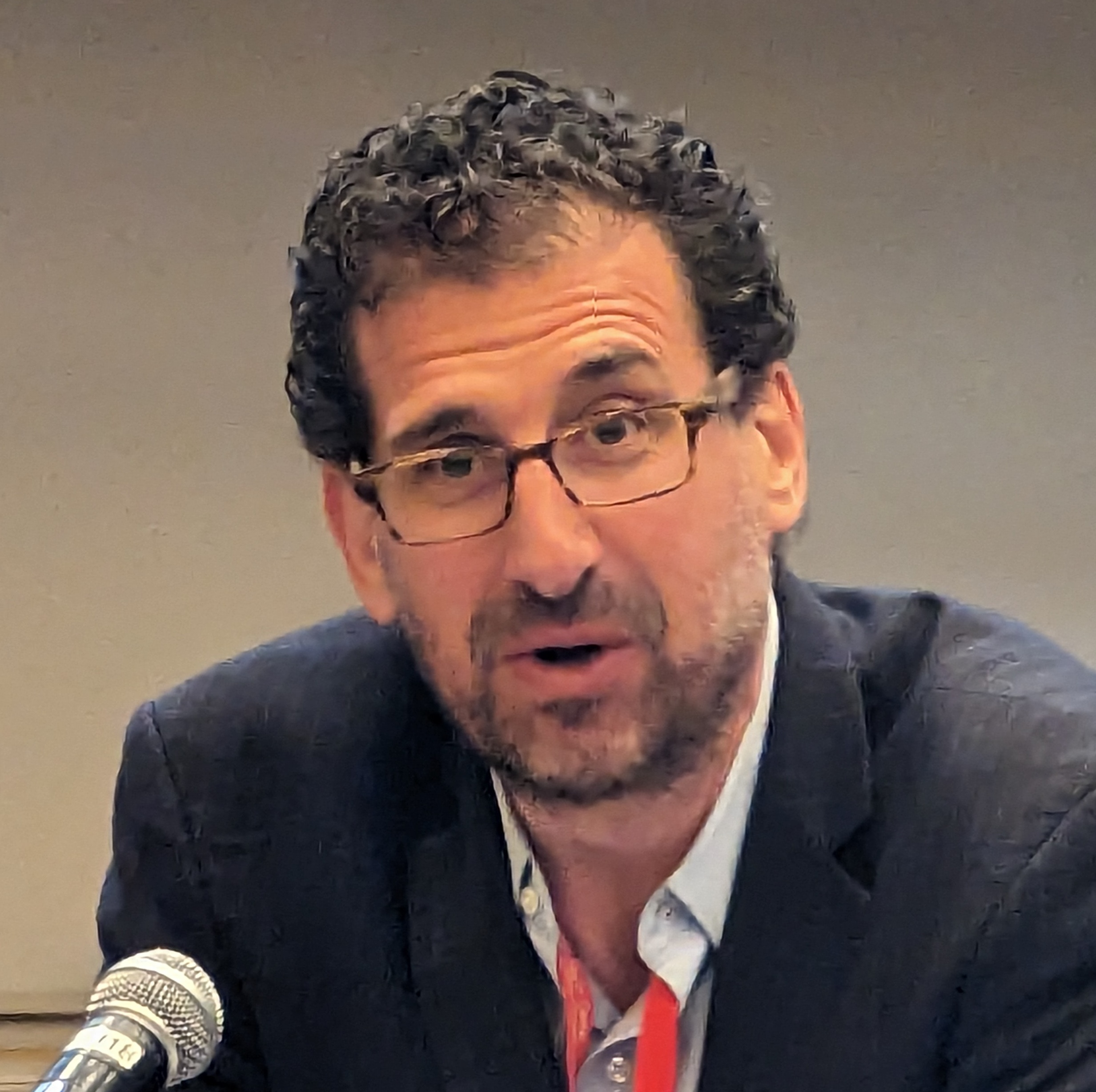
- Eisinger in 2023
- Education: Columbia College (BA)
- Occupation: Journalist
- Employer: ProPublica
- Spouse: Sarah Ellison
- Awards: Pulitzer Prize for National Reporting (2011)

Jesse Eisinger is an American journalist and author. Winner of the Pulitzer Prize for National Reporting in 2011, he currently works as a senior reporter for ProPublica. His first book, The Chickenshit Club: Why the Justice Department Fails to Prosecute Executives, was published by Simon & Schuster in 2017.

Eisinger's work has appeared in ProPublica, The New York Times, The Wall Street Journal, The Atlantic, The New Yorker website, and many other publications.

== Education ==
Eisinger is a 1992 graduate of Columbia College, where he majored in American Studies.

== Early career ==
Eisinger began his career with The South Pacific Mail in Santiago, Chile. He moved to Dow Jones Newswires and then TheStreet.com, where he covered biotechnology and pharmaceuticals.

In 2000, Eisinger was hired by The Wall Street Journal Europe, where he wrote the thrice-weekly column "Heard in Europe" for two years.

While working in Europe, Eisinger helped expose frauds at Lernout & Hauspie, a Belgian company specializing in voice recognition software, and Élan, an Irish pharmaceutical company.

== Financial and investigative reporting ==
Eisinger moved to New York in 2002 to write for The Wall Street Journal. His first column was called "Ahead of the Tape". After two years, he started writing a new financial column called “Long and Short”.

In 2006, Eisinger joined the Conde Nast Portfolio as the magazine's Wall Street editor. His cover story in November 2007, titled Wall Street Requiem, predicted the collapse of Bear Stearns and Lehman Brothers.

Eisinger argued that Goldman Sachs, Morgan Stanley, Lehman Brothers, Merrill Lynch, and Bear Stearns were similar to low-credit borrowers who took on riskier mortgages than they could really afford, thus likely to default, or in the case of the investment banks, especially Bear Stearns, likely to be acquired up by another or just go out of business.

"There is an end of the era feel to the whole thing...After all those years of investment bankers being mistakenly lambasted as rogues, it will be ironic if the moment Wall Street finally embraced its reputation became its undoing." - Jesse Eisinger, November 2007, Conde Nast Portfolio

In 2009, Eisinger was hired as a senior reporter by ProPublica, the nonprofit investigative newsroom.

== Pulitzer Prize ==
In 2009, Eisinger began work on a series of stories, The Wall Street Money Machine, "that documented the lead up to the 2008 financial crisis", revealing how Wall Street's morally questionable practices had led to the worst financial crisis since the Great Depression.

Co-authored with Krista Kjellman Schmidt, and Jake Bernstein, and authored by Cora Currier, and Paul Steiger, the 2010-2014 5-year, 61-story series was awarded the Pulitzer Prize for National Reporting in 2011. It was the first Pulitzer Prize awarded to a group of stories published in a digital-only format.

== Other awards ==
Eisinger was a New America Fellow in 2016 and 2017.

Eisinger's Wall Street series was also nominated for the 2011 Goldsmith Prize for Investigative Reporting. He would be nominated again for the Goldsmith in 2015 for a series of stories about the Red Cross, written with Justin Elliott of ProPublica and NPR’s Laura Sullivan.

In 2015, Eisinger was honored with the Gerald Loeb Award for his Wall Street commentary.

== Works ==
- Eisinger, Jesse (July 11, 2017). The Chickenshit Club: Why the Justice Department Fails to Prosecute Executives. Simon & Schuster. ISBN 9781501121364.
- "Wall Street Requiem". Portfolio.com Condé Nast Portfolio. November 2007. Archived from the original on 2007-10-18.

== Personal life ==
Eisinger is married to fellow journalist Sarah Ellison.
