= Gaston Bastiaens =

Belgian engineer and businessman

- Born: December 16, 1946 (age 79); Westerlo, Belgium
- Education: KU Leuven
- Occupations: Businessman, engineer, soft- and hardware developer
- Employers: Philips Electronics (1972-1992); Apple Computer (1992-1994; Quarterdeck (1995-1996); Lernout & Hauspie (1996-2001)
- Criminal charges: Fraud
- Criminal penalty: 3 years in prison, 2 years supervised release
- Criminal status: In custody

Gaston Bastiaens (born 16 December 1946 in Westerlo, Belgium) is a convicted criminal, Belgian engineer, and businessman. As a vice president of Philips Electronics, he was responsible for the Compact Disc as well as for CD-i, CD-ROM, Philips' contributions to the MPEG standard and the foundations for the DVD.

== Career ==
=== Philips Electronics ===
After graduating with distinction from the KU Leuven (Belgium) in Electrical and Nuclear Engineering, Bastiaens served in the military from 1971 to 1972. In 1972 he joined the Hi-Fi division of Philips Electronics in Leuven, where he served in various management capacities until 1982. During his earlier years there he created a number of new production methods, including for the assembly of loudspeaker systems, manufacturing of tuners and component insertion in printed circuit boards. By introducing new strategies including CAD/CAM, he was later able to reduce the development time of Hi-Fi components from 18 months to nine.

In 1983 Bastiaens was promoted to the Philips headquarters in Eindhoven where he became a general manager and director with worldwide responsibility for the Compact Disc project. Between 1983 and 1986 he oversaw a multi-divisional engineering effort the bring the cost of a compact disc player from 1150 Dutch guilders down to 220. The project was internally called "25–250": By reducing the cost of key components such as the laser module, the drive unit, the decoding circuit, etc. to 25 guilders each, the target was to enable Philips to build the product for 250 guilders. Bastiaens then concentrated on selling OEM licenses for the CD technology as well as maintaining a global market share of 20 percent in Compact Disc mechanisms for Philips. He was also responsible of diversification efforts such as CD-ROM and CD-ROM XA.

From 1988–92 Bastiaens was general manager and director of the Multimedia Division of Philips Consumer Electronics. Jan Timmer, then Philips' head of Consumer Electronics, gave him four months to make or break the Compact Disc Interactive (CD-I) project, a joint effort between Sony and Philips to enhance the CD standard with multi-media technology. This so-called "Green Book" standard had been in development since 1985 but was still in the concept phase when Bastiaens took charge. He started out by changing the project to "full motion video", which would enable a CD-I disc to hold a full-length feature movie but was rather ambitious at the time, as the compression and decoding hard- and software had yet to be developed. The success of the project also hinged on the creation of software and tools to create the content which would be essential in driving the market. Bastiaens moved the project into the MPEG standard, getting Philips more actively involved in that technology. By the time the first CD-I products where launched in 1992, using the MPEG-1 standard for video, development of MPEG-2 technology was well under way for the upcoming DVD technology, which used a red laser for encoding more than eleven times as much information on a disk of the same size as a CD, which used a yellow laser.

=== Apple Computer ===
In July of 1992 Bastiaens was approached by Apple CEO John Sculley to move to Apple Computer as a vice president, and the first General Manager of Apple's newly formed Personal Interactive Electronics (PIE) division in the early 1990s. In this role, he oversaw the launch of the Apple Newton. In 1993, at the CeBIT tradeshow at Hanover, Germany, Bastiaens wagered a bet against a journalist that the Newton would ship the Newton MessagePad by the end of the summer using his personal wine cellar as collateral. While it did launch by August, during the Macworld Expo in Boston, its OS was incredibly buggy, including its handwriting recognition software. Facing criticism that he had rushed release to avoid losing his wine cellar, Bastiaens eventually left Apple in April of 1994.

== After Apple ==
In 1995, he was made president of Quarterdeck, a Santa Monica, California-based software firm, to help it bounce back from a steady drop in sales and a plummeting stock price. Despite an expanding portfolio of internet based products, Quarterdesk continued to post loses and Bastiaens resigned in August of 1996.

== Criminal charges ==
In 1996, he became president, and CEO of Lernout & Hauspie, a speech software company.

In August 2000, the Wall Street Journal published an investigative expose of L&H after it had made several large buyouts including Dictaphone - a Massachuettes-based speech recognition software company - and Dragon Systems - also of Massachusetts company - for well below market value. While the purchases themselves weren't the main focus of the expose, the Journal discovered during the course of its investigation that several "customer" based in Korea didn't actually exist. Those non-existent customers lead to stock manipulation accusations, which caught the eye of the Securities Exchange Commission.

Despite disputing the accusations made in the article, Bastiaens, along with the company's owners, Jo Lernout and Pol Hauspie, and a former director, Nico Willaert, were arrested in 2001. He was accused of fraud, and extradited to Belgium. On 21 May 2007, he went to trial in Ghent, Belgium.

On 20 September 2010 Gaston Bastiaens was sentenced to three years in prison and two years of probation. In December 2010, he appealed the sentence, which was later denied and the Belgium court affirmed the €655 million in damages.
