= Zelenkov =

Zelenkov (feminine: Zelenkova) is a Russian and Ukrainian surname. Latvianized form: Zelenkovs. Notable people with the surname include:

- Aleksandr Zelenkov (born 1991), Russian wrestler
- Ekaterina Zelenkova, Russian handball player
- Olga Zelenkova, Soviet swimmer
