= Sarah Ellison =

American journalist

Sarah Ellison is an American journalist. She is a reporter for The Washington Post. Previously, she served as a special correspondent for Vanity Fair, where she covered politics, culture, and media. Ellison is a regular commentator on CNN, NBC, MSNBC, and other news outlets. She is also a frequent guest on programs such as WNYC, PBS NewsHour, and Democracy Now!

Her first book, War at the Wall Street Journal, was published in 2010.

== Education ==
Ellison grew up in Hanover, Pennsylvania. She attended the University of Virginia, where she graduated with honors.

== Early career ==
Ellison began her journalism career with the Paris bureau of Newsweek. Subsequently, she was hired as a reporter by the Wall Street Journal. She spent the next decade working in the Journal's bureaus in Paris, London, and New York, before leaving to write her book, War at the Wall Street Journal. Called "definitive" and "cinematic" by a reviewer in the New York Times, War at the Wall Street Journal was a firsthand account of Rupert Murdoch’s hostile takeover in 2007.

After the book was published, Ellison was banned from a Wall Street Journal press conference, in a move interpreted by observers as retaliation for her book’s critical coverage. She has also criticized the Journal for adopting what she sees as more conservative political stances over time.

== Vanity Fair ==
Ellison joined Vanity Fair in 2010 as a contributing editor. In 2016, she was promoted to special correspondent, following her activity for Vanity Fair’s blog, The Hive, which concentrates towards Washington, technology, and politics.

Her work at the magazine covered a wide range of sensitive cultural and political issues, including an exclusive interview with three former supporters of ‘Jackie’, the subject of a discredited campus rape story by Rolling Stone.

Other prominent stories included exposés of the Washington elite’s hostile reception of Jared Kushner and Ivanka Trump, and the struggle of conservative commentators like Megyn Kelly to attract mainstream audiences after leaving Fox News.

== Washington Post ==
Late in 2017, it was revealed that Ellison would be joining The Washington Post to write features on the intersection of media, politics, and technology. She is scheduled to begin publishing with the Post on January 22, 2018.

== Awards ==
The Newswomen’s Club of New York awarded Ellison its Front Page Award in 2017 for her work with Vanity Fair’s blog, The Hive.

In 2015, she was awarded the Mirror Awards' John M. Higgins Award for Best In-Depth/Enterprise Reporting for her contributions to an article titled "The Snowden Saga: A Shadowland of Secrets and Light." Her writing has also been recognized by the New York Press Club.

== Family ==
Ellison is married to the Pulitzer Prize-winning journalist Jesse Eisinger. They live in Brooklyn with their daughters.

== Bibliography ==
- Sarah Ellison, War at the Wall Street Journal, Houghton Mifflin Harcourt, May 2010, ISBN 978-0-547-15243-1
