= Norton CleanSweep =

Norton CleanSweep, originally released by Quarterdeck in 1995, is a software application designed to aid in the removal of installed programs on Microsoft Windows. Quarterdeck was acquired by Symantec in 1998.

== History ==
In Windows 3.x, some applications were removed from the computer only via the File Manager, so several files (INI files, DLL libraries, fonts or drivers) remained in the system, taking up harddrive space and hindering performance. This opened a market for applications dedicated to solving this issue. Quarterdeck introduced CleanSweep in early 1995 as a utility to completely uninstall complex Windows applications. Its main competitors back then were MicroHelp UnInstaller and Remove-it from Vertisoft Systems. CleanSweep 95 (2.0) for Windows 95 was released later in 1995 as the very first application of this kind for the new operating system. Quarterdeck was acquired by Symantec in 1998.

== Features ==
Upon startup, CleanSweep loads three components, each of which tracks and logs changes made to aid in uninstallation. If the program has not been monitored CleanSweep can be pointed to the main executable file or the main program group. It also comprises several "wizards" to simplify common PC tuneup activities. The "Smart Sweep" module takes care of monitoring all the setup programs being run. On detecting the execution of a setup program, it makes a note of the program files location, changes to Registry and other details. The "Internet Sweep" module monitors the installation of ActiveX controls and Plug-ins. The "Usage Watch" component keeps track of files which are being accessed. The "Unused and Low Usage File Finders" information collected through Usage Watch to determine which files are infrequently accessed and thus may no longer be needed. CleanSweep keeps backups of all uninstalled programs for a specified amount of time. If an essential file is accidentally removed, the user has the option of restoration.

== Reception ==
InfoWorld review of the first version (2.0) for Windows 95 commended easy to use interface, but criticized limited support for Windows registry editing. Review of the CleanSweep Deluxe in 1997 compared it favorably to the first release of Norton Uninstall Deluxe. PC Magazine recognized CleanSweep in its 1998 comparison of uninstallers as the editor's choice highlighting its combination of performance and safety.
