= Margarethe Selenka =

German anthropologist and feminist

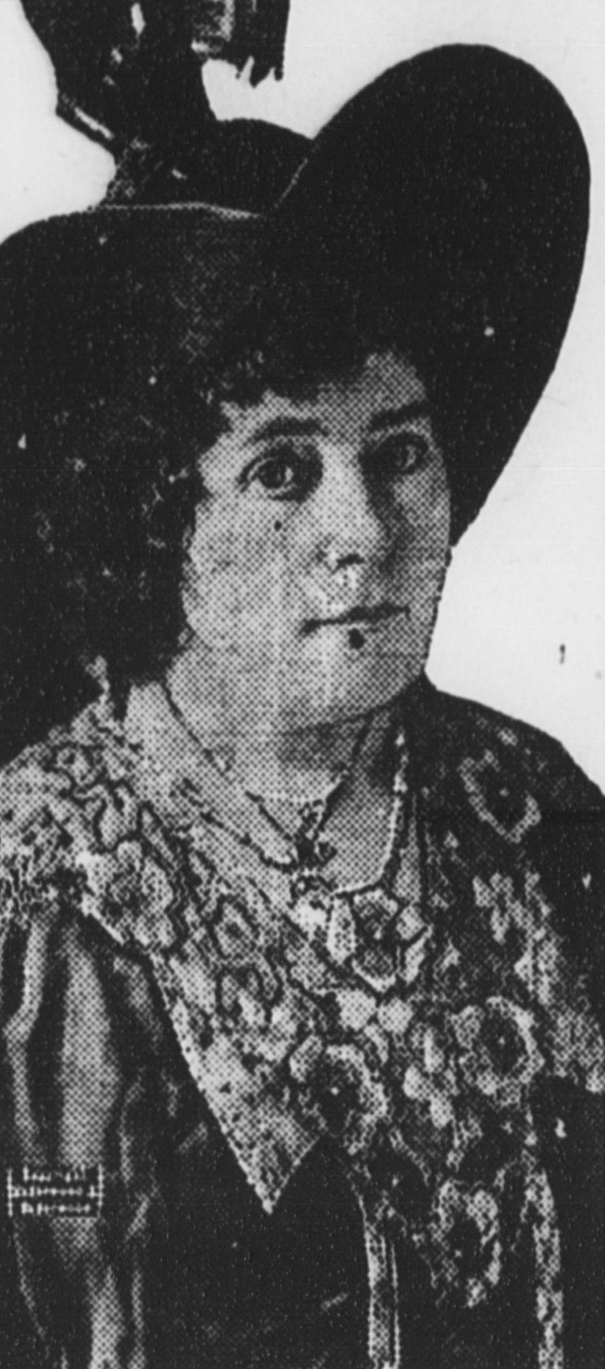
- Margarethe Selenka, from a 1917 publication
- Born: Margarethe Lenore Heinemann; 7 October 1860; Hamburg
- Died: 16 December 1922 (aged 62); Munich
- Other name: Margarethe Zelenka
- Occupations: Anthropologist, zoologist, feminist, pacifist
- Spouse: Emil Selenka

Margarethe Lenore Selenka (née Heinemann) (7 October 1860, Hamburg – 16 December 1922, Munich), also known as Margarethe Zelenka, was a German zoologist, anthropologist, feminist and pacifist. She researched apes and led scientific expeditions to the Dutch East Indies.

== Early life ==
Margarethe Lenore Heinemann was the daughter of a merchant. In 1886, she married the writer Ferdinand Neubürger, but the marriage ended in a divorce a few of years later. In 1893, she remarried, to Emil Selenka, a professor in zoology at the University of Erlangen, who was the widower of her sister.

Under Selenka's influence, she began to study palaeontology, anthropology and zoology and became his assistant. In 1892, she participated in a scientific expedition to Ceylon, Japan, China and the Dutch East Indies led by her husband. When Emil Selenka became severely ill during their stay in the Dutch East Indies and had to return to Germany, she continued the work, spending some months exploring the jungles of Borneo to study apes. Back in Germany the couple wrote a report on their journeys titled Sonnige Welten: Ostasiatische Reiseskizzen ("Sunny Worlds: East Asian Travel Sketches").

== Feminism ==
The Selenkas moved to Munich in 1895. Here, she would eventually become a professor at the Ludwig-Maximilians-Universität München. She befriended the feminists Anita Augspurg and Lida Gustava Heymann and became involved in the German feminist-pacifist movement, that associated domestic violence against women with the tendency in countries to go to war.

Together with Augspurg, who was Germany's first female professional lawyer, Selenka campaigned for women's suffrage and legal gender equality in the German Empire. She became a member of the Verband fortschrittlicher Frauenvereine (VfFV), Germany's feminist organization that was considered radical at the time. Selenka was also a pacifist, who believed future wars could be prevented by dialogue and the establishment of international laws. In 1899, she was the main organizer of an international pacifist demonstration.

== Anthropological work ==
Meanwhile, the scientific work of the Selenkas continued. They were intrigued by Eugène Dubois' discovery of Java Man fossils (Homo erectus) at Trinil in 1891. Dubois claimed to have discovered the evolutionary "missing link" between apes and humans. However, not all scientists agreed, and the debate was made difficult by Dubois' refusal to show others his fossils. Emil Selenka decided to organize an expedition to Java to find more evidence. However, he died in 1902, leaving the task to his wife. Margarethe Selenka continued the work and the expedition took place in 1907–08. It was unsuccessful in discovering more Java man fossils at Trinil, but it did make a thorough contribution to the regional stratigraphy and many fossils of Pleistocene mammals were found. The report was supervised by Selenka and the geologist Max Blanckenhorn and was internationally praised for its accuracy. Many of the positive reactions came from opponents of Dubois' ideas, like the British anatomist Arthur Keith, who saw the report as proof against Dubois.

In the late 20th century, the report has been cited by creationists because it states that a human molar was found during the excavations at Trinil. Creationists see this as proof that modern humans lived at the same time as Java men, thus excluding the possibility that Java man can be a direct ancestor for humans. This is based on a misunderstanding since Homo erectus is today by anthropologists seen as human itself.

== International conferences ==
In 1904, Selenka represented the VfFV at the international peace conference in Boston. After a dispute with Augspurg and Heymann she left the VfFV and joined the rival Bund für Mutterschutz und Sexualreform (BfMS), which was founded by her friend Helene Stöcker. In 1915 she participated in an international peace conference at The Hague, initiated by czar Nicholas II in an effort to stop the First World War. Like other pacifist activists, Selenka was placed under house arrest by the German government. In 1917, she traveled to New York to attend the meeting of the American Association for the Advancement of Science, and speak on science as a force for peace.

== See also ==
- List of peace activists

== Works ==
- Selenka, Emil; Selenka, Lenore (1905). Sonnige Welten: Ostasiatische Reiseskizzen [Sunny worlds: East Asian travel sketches] (in German). Wiesbaden C.W. Kreidel.
