= Norton SystemWorks =

- Original author: Peter Norton
- Developer: Symantec
- Initial release: September 1998; 27 years ago

Final release(s)
- Windows: 12.0 / September 23, 2009; 16 years ago
- Mac: 3.0.1 / July 1, 2003; 22 years ago
- Operating system: Windows, Classic Mac OS, macOS
- Type: Utility software
- License: Trialware
- Website: www.symantec-norton.com/Norton_SystemWorks_Basic_Edition_p15.aspx

Norton SystemWorks is a discontinued utility software suite by Symantec Corp. It integrates three of Symantec's most popular products – Norton Utilities, Norton CrashGuard and Norton AntiVirus – into one program designed to simplify solving common PC issues. Backup software was added later to high-end editions. SystemWorks was innovative in that it combined several applications into an all-in-one software for managing computer health, thus saving significant costs and time often spent on using different unrelated programs. SystemWorks, which was introduced in 1998 has since inspired a host of competitors such as iolo System Mechanic, McAfee Nuts And Bolts, Badosoft First Aid and many others.

Norton SystemWorks for Windows was initially offered alongside Norton Utilities until it replaced it as Symantec's flagship (and only) utility software in 2003. SystemWorks was discontinued in 2009, allowing Norton Utilities to return as Symantec's main utility suite. The Mac edition, lasting only three versions, was discontinued in 2004 to allow Symantec to concentrate its efforts solely on Internet security products for the Mac.

== Norton NT Tools ==
The precursor of Norton SystemWorks was released in March 1996 for PCs running Windows NT 3.51 or later.

It included Norton AntiVirus Scanner, Norton File Manager (based on Norton Navigator), UNC browser, Norton Fast Find, Norton Zip/Unzip, Norton Folder Synchronization, Folder Compare, Norton System Doctor, System Information, Norton Control Center.

== Norton Protected Desktop Solution ==
An application suite built similar to Norton SystemWorks but included different set of tools to enable support of DOS, Windows 3.1, Windows 95, or Windows NT. Released in July 1998, it included Norton Software Distribution Utility 2.0, Norton CrashGuard 2.0 for Windows NT, Norton CrashGuard 3.0 for Windows 95, Norton Speed Disk for Windows 95/NT, Norton Disk Doctor for Windows 95/NT, Norton AntiVirus 4.0 for DOS/Windows 3.1, and Norton AntiVirus 4.0 for Windows 95/NT. Other administrator components include LiveUpdate Administrator, Norton Utilities for Windows 95 3.0, Norton Utilities 8.0 for DOS/Windows 3.1, and Norton Utilities for NT 2.0.

== Windows version history ==
=== 1.0 ===
The original version was released in September 1998. It included Norton Utilities, Norton AntiVirus, Norton CrashGuard, and a six-month subscription to Norton Web Services. It also included the Norton SystemWorks Bonus Pack, which contains Norton Mobile Essentials, Visual Page, WinFax Basic Edition, and pcANYWHERE Express.

It supports Windows 95 and 98.

The Professional Edition was released three months later in December 1998 and included Norton 2000 and Norton Ghost.

=== 2.0 ===
Version 2.0 of the software released to consumers in March 1999.

The Standard Edition included Norton Utilities 4.0, Norton CleanSweep 4.5, Norton CrashGuard 4.0, and a six-month subscription to Norton Web Services. The bonus pack included Zip-It, Visual Page, WinFax Basic Edition, and Norton 2000.

The Professional Edition also included full versions of Norton 2000 and Norton Ghost on top of the Standard Edition.

=== 2000 (3.0) ===
Year 2000 of the software released to consumers in August 1999.

The Standard Edition included Norton AntiVirus 2000, Norton Utilities 2000, Norton CleanSweep 2000, Norton CrashGuard 2000, a six-month subscription to Norton Web Services, LiveAdvisor, Zip-It, Visual Page, Norton Secret Stuff, WinFax Basic Edition, and Norton 2000 BIOS Test & Fix.

The Professional Edition included Norton Ghost 2000 and Norton 2000.

=== 2001 (4.0) ===
Version 2001 of the software was released in August 2000 for consumer retail purchase.

This release supported Windows Millennium Edition, NT and 2000.

The Standard Edition included Norton AntiVirus 2001, Norton Utilities 2001, Norton CleanSweep 2001, and Norton Web Services, a free Internet-based service powered by ZDNet Updates for problem solving, self-help, and extended support services.

The Professional Edition added Norton Ghost 2001 and WinFax 10.0 Basic Edition.

=== 2002 ===
Made available in August 2001 for consumer purchase, the 2002 update added Windows XP support.

The Standard Edition included Norton AntiVirus 2002, Norton Utilities 2002, Norton CleanSweep 2002, GoBack 3 Personal Edition, Process Viewer, and One Button Checkup.

The Professional Edition added Norton Ghost 2002 and WinFax 10.0 Basic Edition over the Standard Edition.

=== 2003 ===
Released in September 2002 to consumers for retail purchase, the Standard Edition included Norton AntiVirus 2003, Norton Utilities, Norton CleanSweep, Web Tools, GoBack 3 Personal Edition, and One Button Checkup.

The Professional Edition added Norton Ghost 2003, Process Viewer, and PerformanceTest on top of the Standard Edition.

=== 2004 ===
Released for consumer purchase in September 2003, Norton SystemWorks 2004 was the first version of the software to introduce product activation.

It supported Windows 98 and above (up through Windows XP).

The Standard Edition included tools like Norton AntiVirus 2004, Norton Password Manager, Norton Utilities 2004, Norton CleanSweep 2004, Norton GoBack Personal Edition, Norton Web Tools, One Button Checkup, Web Cleanup, and Connection Keep Alive.

The Professional Edition – now called Norton SystemWorks 2004 Professional – added Norton Ghost, Process Viewer, and Performance Test.

=== 2005 ===
Released in September 2004 to retail consumers, it included Norton AntiVirus 2005 (now with Internet Worm Protection and QuickScan), Smith Micro Software Inc.'s CheckIt Diagnostics, Norton Utilities 2005, enhanced version of One Button Checkup, Norton Password Manager, Norton CleanSweep 2005, Norton Cleanup, System Optimizer, and Norton GoBack 4.0 with the Standard Edition.

Beginning with this release, Symantec began to market the Professional Edition as Norton SystemWorks 2005 Premier. The Premier version added Symantec Recovery Disk and Norton Ghost 9.0 on top of the Standard Edition.

=== 2006 ===
Released in October 2005, it included Norton Protection Center, Norton GoBack, Norton Cleanup, Norton AntiVirus 2006, One Button Checkup, Norton Utilities, Process Viewer 2.0, and System Optimizer 2.0 with the Standard Edition.

Premier also included Norton Ghost 10.0 and Symantec Recovery Disk on top of the Standard Edition.

In January 2006, Symantec released the Basic Edition of Norton SystemWorks. This edition did not include Norton AntiVirus or Norton Protection Center.

=== 2007 (10.0) ===
Version 10.0 requires Windows XP or above and comes in three editions: Basic, Standard, and Premier.

The Basic Edition included CheckIt Diagnostics, Norton Cleanup, Norton GoBack, Norton Protection Center, Norton Utilities 2007, Norton CleanSweep, Norton CrashGuard, Norton Web services, Process Viewer, System Optimizer, and One Button Checkup.

The Standard Edition adds Norton AntiVirus 2007 on top of Basic.

The Premier Edition adds Norton Save & Restore 1.0 (previously marketed as Norton Ghost) and PerformanceTest on top of the Standard Edition.

=== 2008 (11.0) ===
This version of the software released to consumers for retail purchase in November 2007 and added support for Windows Vista.

It required Windows XP or higher in order to install.

The Basic Edition, now called Norton SystemWorks Basic, included One-Button Checkup, Norton Utilities, Norton Cleanup, and System Optimizer.

The Standard Edition, now called Norton SystemWorks Standard, included Norton AntiVirus 2008 on top of Basic.

The Premier Edition included Norton Save & Restore 2.0 on top of Standard.

=== 12.0 (2009) ===
For the 2009 release, the model year was not used in marketing the product. Instead, the version number (12.0) was printed on the box and used instead, though the model year appears on some Symantec sites. It is also the first Windows version of Norton SystemWorks that does not include Norton Utilities in any edition of the software.

It runs on Windows XP SP2 or higher.

The Basic Edition included Norton Disk Doctor, Norton UnErase Wizard (which only could run on Windows XP), Norton Speed Disk, Norton Cleanup, Norton Startup Manager, Norton WinDoctor, Norton WipeInfo, Process Viewer, System Optimizer, CheckIt Diagnostics, One-Button Checkup, and Performance Test by PassMark software.

The Standard Edition added Norton AntiVirus 2009, Norton Antispyware, Norton Antibot, Norton Pulse Updates, Norton Insight, Norton Protection System, and Browser Protection.

The Premier Edition added Norton Save & Restore 2.0.

By this version, most of the Norton SystemWorks components could be found in the Norton Utilities suite.

== Mac version history ==
=== 1.0 ===
Norton SystemWorks for Macintosh was first released in November 2000.

It included Norton Utilities for Macintosh 6.0, Norton AntiVirus for Macintosh 7.0, LiveUpdate 1.6, Dantz Retrospect Express v4.0.3, Aladdin Spring Cleaning v3.5.

Release 1.0 is compatible with G3 iMacs and G4 PowerMacs running Mac OS 8.1 or higher, it also supports Mac OS X Public Beta.

=== 2.0 ===
Released in October 2001, v2.0 includes Norton SystemWorks 1.0.3 for Mac OS 8.1-9.x, Norton SystemWorks 2.0 for Mac OS X v10.1.

Norton SystemWorks 1.0.3 for Mac OS 9.x includes Norton Utilities 6.0.3 which is backwards compatible with System 7.0.2.

The OS X portion includes Norton AntiVirus 8.0, Norton Utilities 7.0, Norton Disk Doctor, UnErase, Norton Disk Editor, Norton FileSaver, Norton Disk Editor, Norton Scheduler, LiveUpdate, Auto-Protect, SafeZones.

Third-party software (for OS X) includes Dantz Retrospect Express, Aladdin Spring Cleaning and iClean 4.0.2, Alsoft DiskWarrior Recovery Edition.

=== 3.0 ===
Released in July 2003, release 3.0 includes Norton SystemWorks 1.0.3 for Mac OS 9.x, Norton SystemWorks 3.0 for Mac OS X v10.1.5 or later.

Norton SystemWorks 1.0.3 for Mac OS 9.x includes Norton Utilities 6.0.4 which is backwards compatible with System 7.0.2.

The OS X portion includes Norton Utilities 8.0, Volume Recover, Wipe Info and Norton AntiVirus 9.0.

Third-party software includes Aladdin Spring Cleaning 5.0, Dantz Retrospect Express 5.0.238.

Update 3.0.1 added support for G5 models released before December 2004, the 1.25 GHz eMac and various G4 notebooks. However some tools are not compatible with Mac OS X v10.4 Tiger, attempting to run them may cause errors. However, some tools may present errors when running Mac OS X 10.4.

=== End of life ===
In 2004, Symantec confirmed it had stopped developing the Macintosh versions of Norton Utilities and Norton SystemWorks in order to concentrate its efforts solely on Internet security products for the Mac instead. However, it remained listed on some Symantec web sites for more than a year afterwards. Spring Cleaning and Retrospect continued to be sold separately.
