= MacHTTP =

MacHTTP is a web server designed to run on the classic Mac OS versions 7.x through 9.x. Written by software developer Chuck Shotton, it was the first ever web server for Mac OS. It was originally released as shareware in 1993 but was commercialized starting in November 1994 with version 2.0 through Biap Systems. It was later commercialized as WebSTAR, sold originally by StarNine and later bought by Quarterdeck Corporation; both companies continued to offer MacHTTP as a freeware version of WebSTAR. Both MacHTTP and WebSTAR were the predominant web server software for Macintosh computers through to the late 1990s. It is now available in source code form from SourceForge and GitHub under the Perl Artistic License. The current version is 2.6.1. It is still used on some older Macintosh hardware.

The program runs on Mac OS X under the Classic Environment, but has not been ported to run natively on Mac OS X. It has functionally been replaced with the Apache web server.

MacHTTP supports the Common Gateway Interface standard for generating dynamic content, as well as Apple Events for scriptability.
