= Zelenko =

Zelenko (Ukrainian: Зеленко) is a Ukrainian language surname that is derived from the word "zeleny" ("зелений"), which means "green".

- Alexander Zelenko (1871–1953), Russian architect
- Alexander Zelenko (equestrian) (born 1976), Belarusian equestrian
- Herbert Zelenko (1906–1979), American politician from New York
- Kateryna Zelenko (born 1980), Ukrainian diplomat
- Paula Zelenko (born 1957), American politician from Michigan
- Yekaterina Zelenko (1916–1941), Ukrainian fighter pilot
- Vladimir Zelenko (1973–2022), Ukrainian-American physician
