= Bramine Hubrecht =

Dutch painter

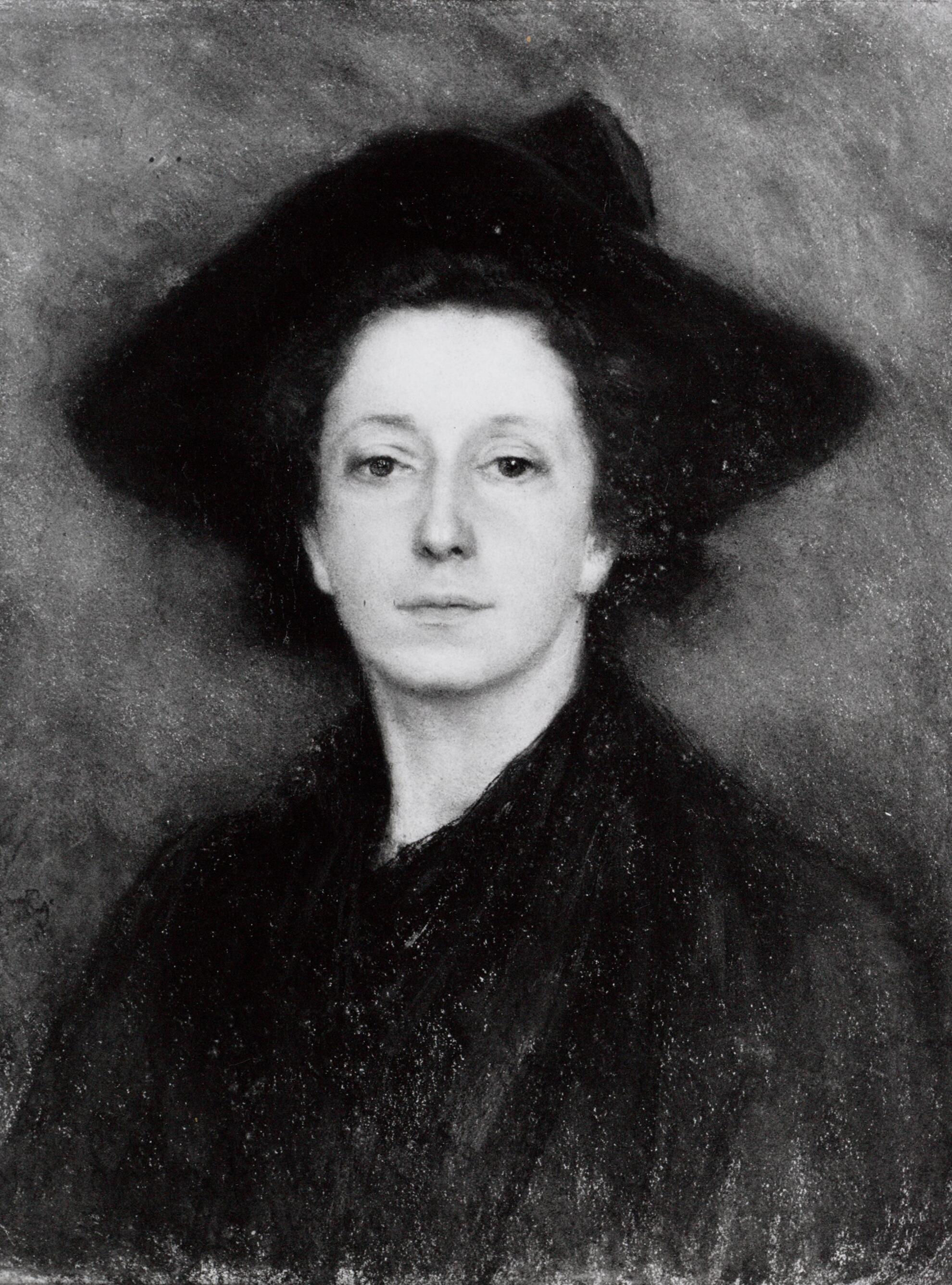
- Self-portrait
- Born: Abrahamina Arnolda Louise Hubrecht; 21 July 1855; Rotterdam, Netherlands
- Died: 5 November 1913 (aged 58); Holmbury St Mary, United Kingdom
- Known for: Painting

Abrahamina Arnolda Louise Hubrecht (1855–1913) was a Dutch painter, etcher, and illustrator.

== Biography ==
Hubrecht was born 21 July 1855 in Rotterdam. She attended Royal Academy of Art at The Hague and the State Academy of Fine Arts in Amsterdam. She married twice, in 1888 to Franciscus Donders (1818–1889), and in 1892 to Alphons Marie Antoine Joseph Grandmont (1837–1909). Her sister, Maria Hubrecht (1865–1950) was also a painter.

Hubrecht was a member of the Arti et Amicitiae and the Pulchri Studio. She exhibited her work at the Palace of Fine Arts at the 1893 World's Columbian Exposition in Chicago, Illinois.

Hubrecht died 5 November 1913 in Holmbury St Mary, Britain. Her work is in the Rijksmuseum.

== Gallery ==
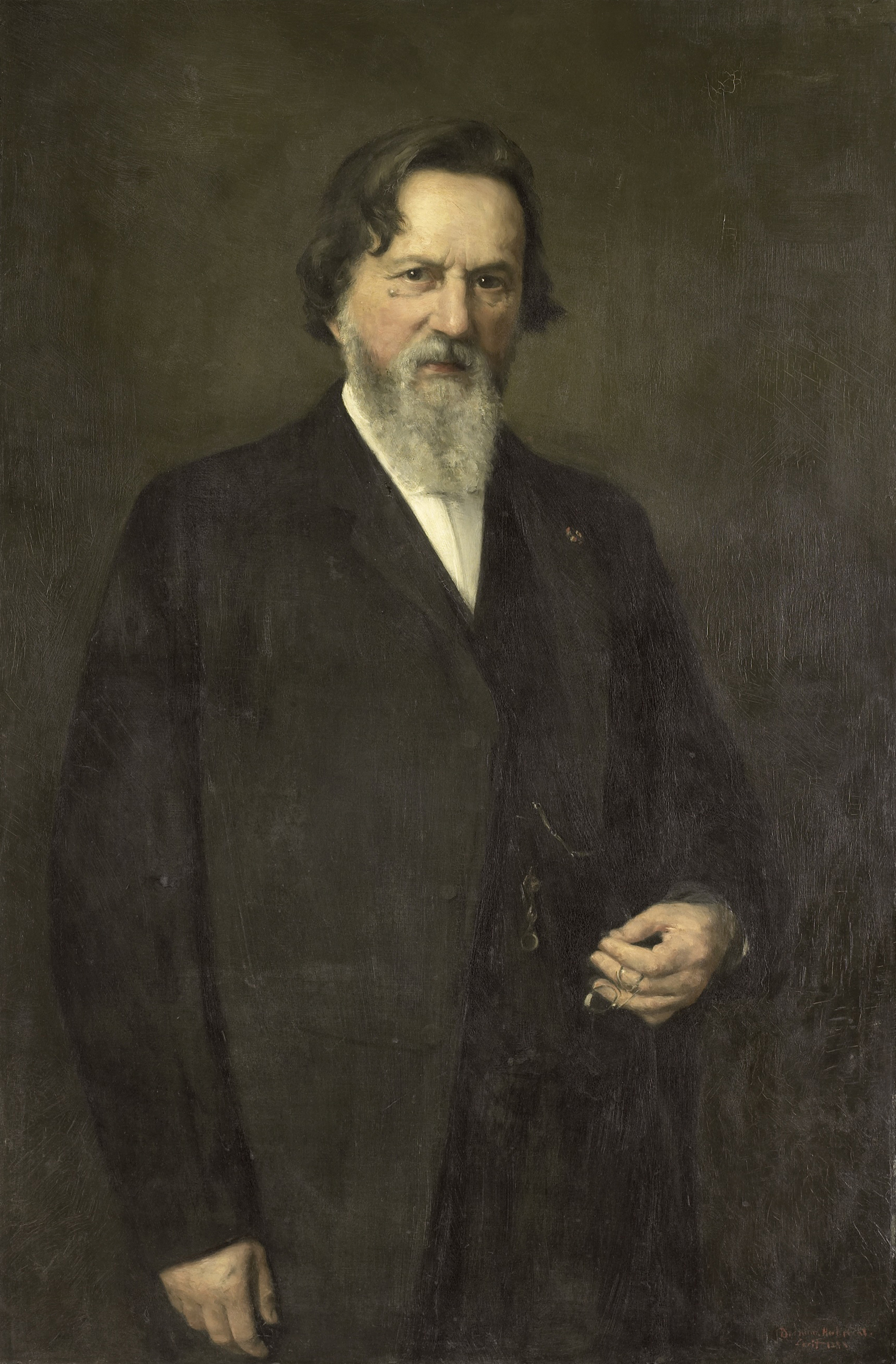
Franciscus Donders (1818–1889), the Artist's first husband

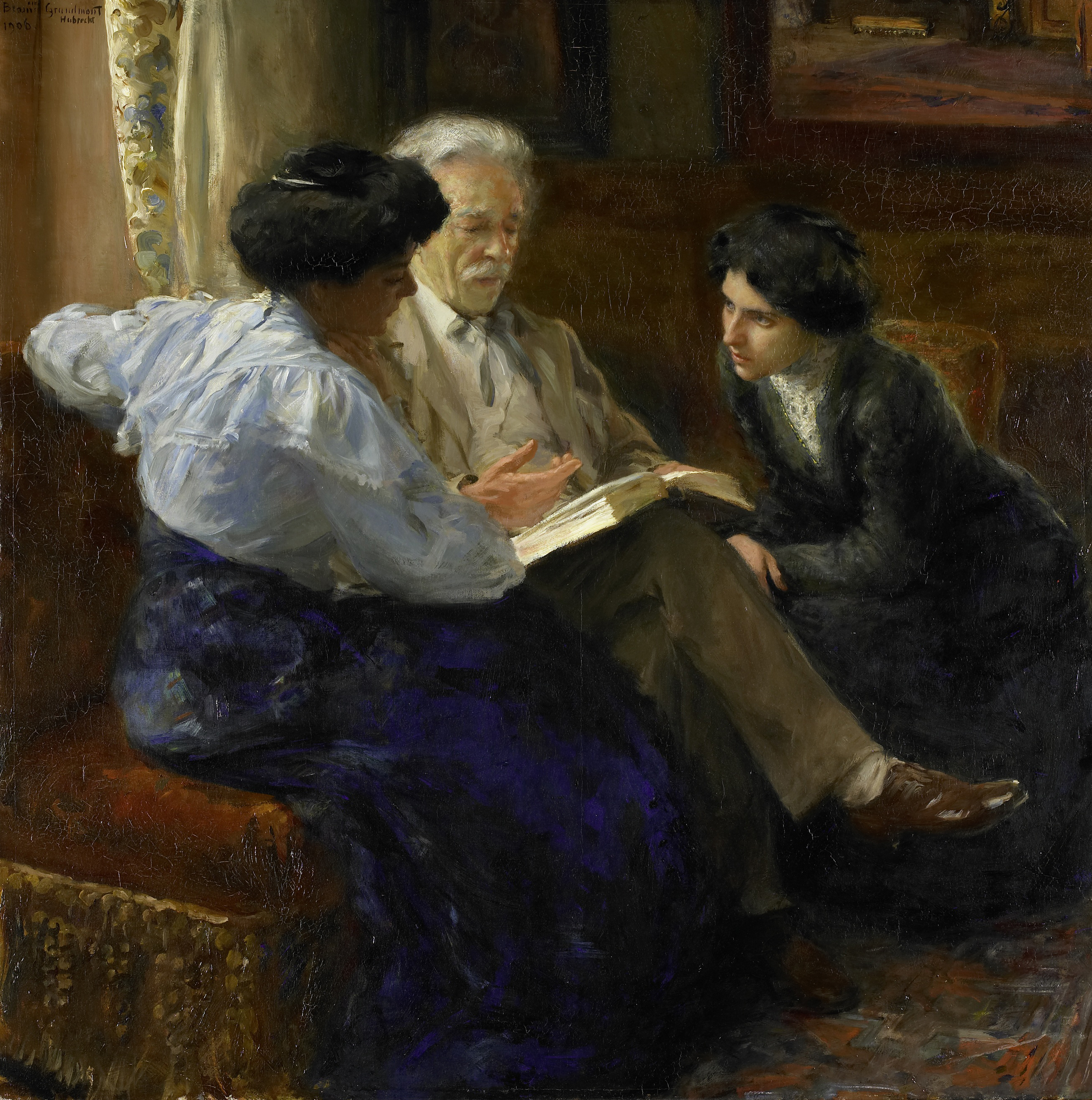
A. M. A. J. Grandmont (1837–1909), the Artist's second husband, Tutoring two Italian Girls

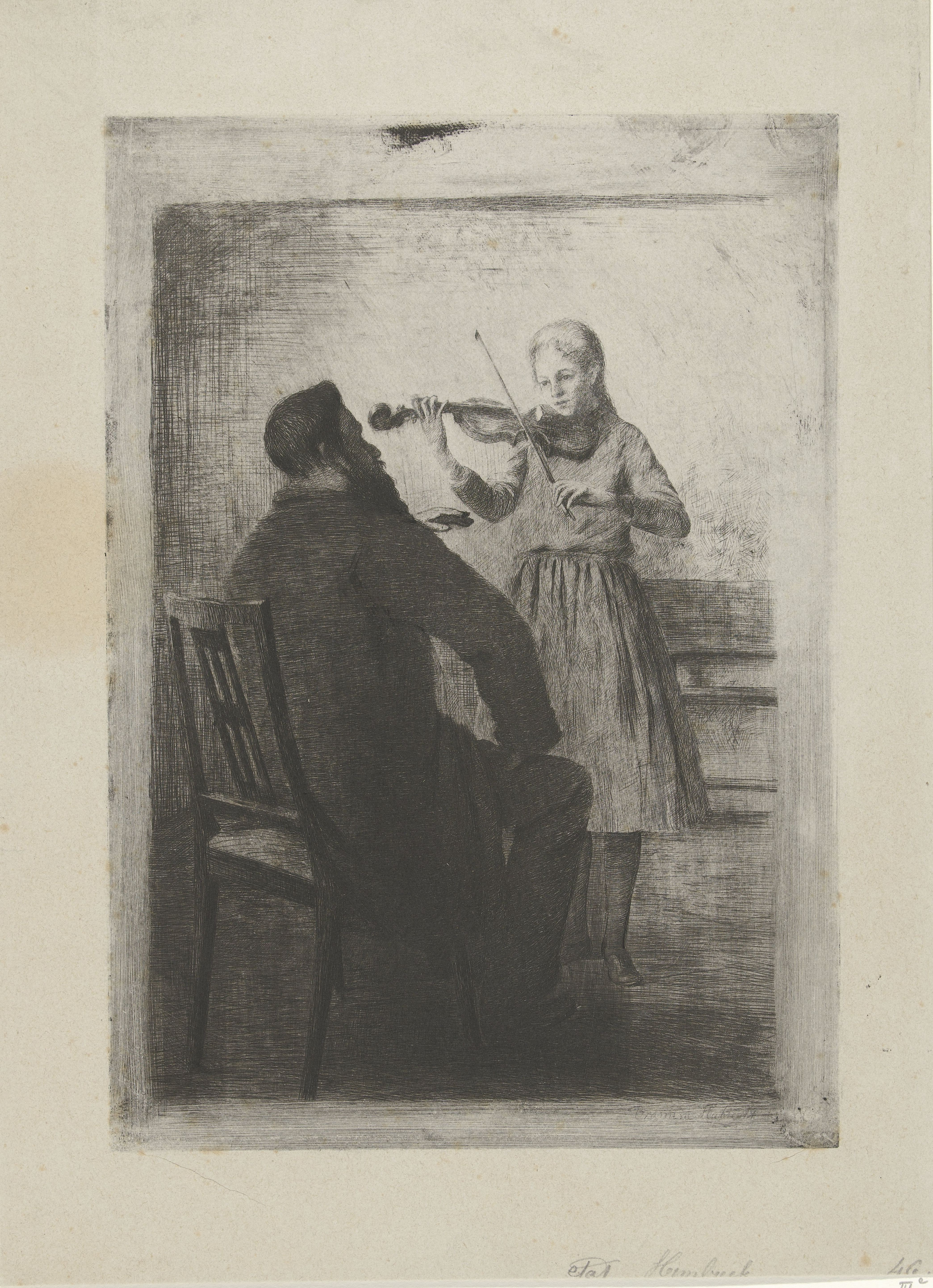
Playing violin

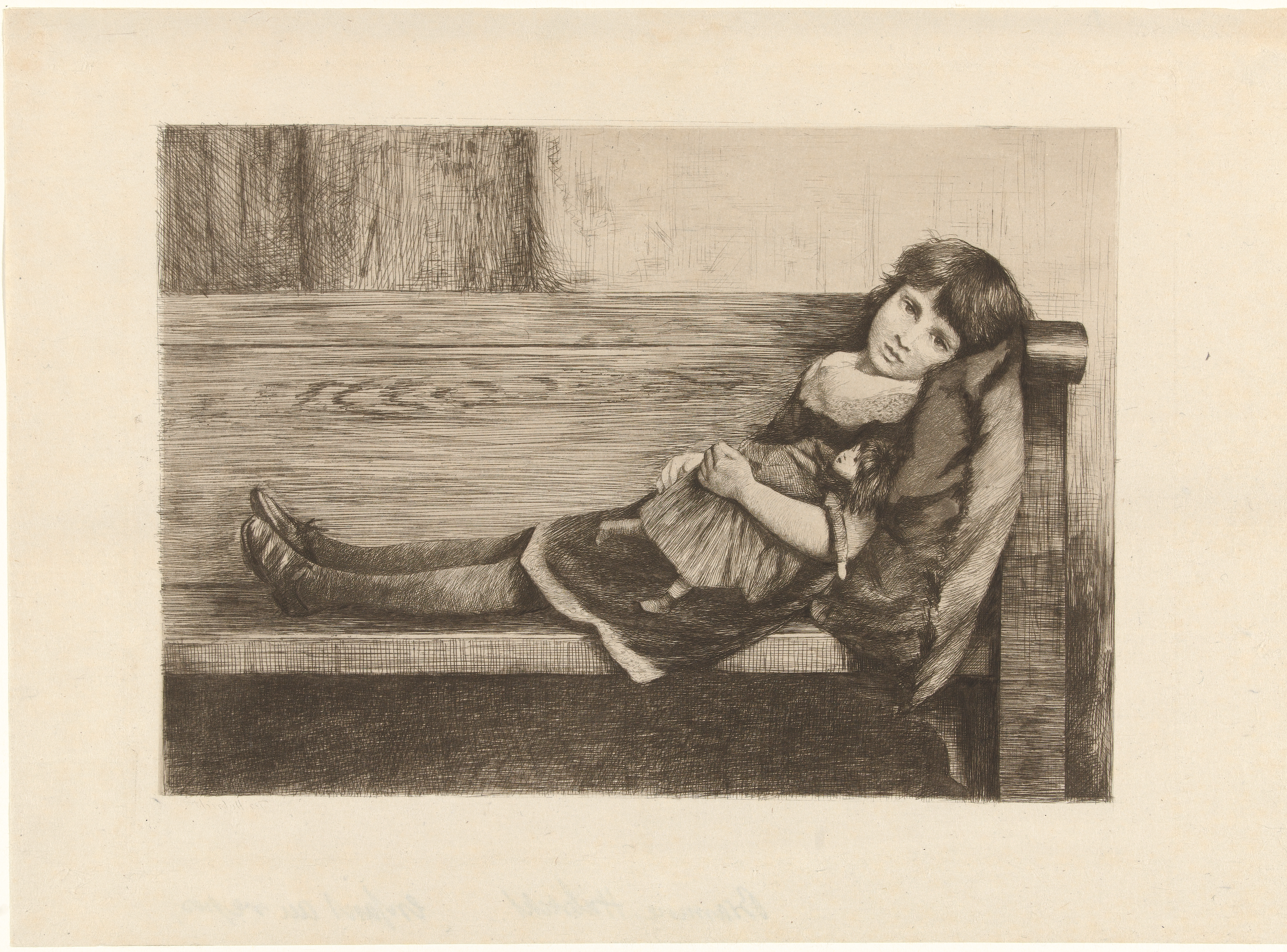
Child with doll
