= Verhoeven =

Verhoeven is a noble toponymic surname of Dutch origin. The name is a contraction of van der Hoeven, meaning "from the homestead". In 2007, Verhoeven was the 44th most common name in the Netherlands (15,902 people). People with this surname include:

- Abraham Verhoeven (1575–1652), Flemish newspaper publisher
- Arthur Verhoeven (1889–1958), Belgian composer and organist
- Aurore Verhoeven (born 1990), French cyclist
- Cornelis Verhoeven (1928–2001), Dutch philosopher and writer
- Deb Verhoeven, Australian media academic and film critic
- Helen Verhoeven (born 1974), Dutch painter and sculptor
- Frans Verhoeven (born 1966), Dutch motocross racer
- Jeroen Verhoeven (born 1980), Dutch football player
- John Verhoeven (fl. 1920), Belgian cyclist
- John Verhoeven (born 1953), American baseball pitcher
- Jorg Verhoeven (born 1985), Dutch sports climber
- Julie Verhoeven (born 1969), British illustrator and designer
- Kees Verhoeven (born 1976), Dutch politician and geographer
- Lis Verhoeven (1931–2019), German actress and theatre director, sister of Michael
- Michael Verhoeven (1938–2024), German film director, brother of Lis
- Nico Verhoeven (born 1961), Dutch cyclist
- Noah Verhoeven (born 1999), Canadian soccer player
- Paul Verhoeven (1901–1975), German actor and filmmaker, father of Lis and Michael Verhoeven
- Paul Verhoeven (born 1938), Dutch film director (no relation to German film family)
- Paul Verhoeven (born 1983), Australian radio and television personality
- Paula Verhoeven（born 1987), Indonesian model
- Peter Verhoeven (born 1959), American basketball player
- Renate Verhoeven (born 1995), Dutch footballer
- Rico Verhoeven (born 1989), Dutch kickboxer
- Simon Verhoeven (born 1972), German actor, screenwriter and film director, son of Michael
- Theodor Verhoeven (1907–1990), Dutch Catholic priest, missionary and amateur archaeologist
- Willem Verhoeven (1590–1643), Dutch privateer
- Willem Verhoeven (1738–1809), Flemish poet and playwright
- Yves Verhoeven (born 1961), French actor

Fictional person

- Camille Verhœven, protagonist of a detective trilogy

== See also ==
- Verhoeven Open, an American three-cushion billiards tournament sponsored by the Belgian Verhoeven Billiard Table company
- Verhoeff
- van der Hoeven
- Verhoeven's giant tree rat named in honor of Theodor Verhoeven
