= Emil Selenka =

German zoologist

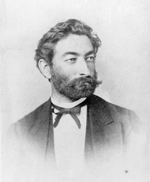
Emil Selenka in c. 1870

Emil Selenka (27 February 1842 – 20 February 1902) was a German zoologist. He is known for his research on invertebrates and apes and the scientific expeditions he organized to Southeast Asia and South America.

== Life ==
Selenka was born on 27 February 1842 in Braunschweig. He was the son of bookbinder Johannes Selenka (1801–1871). He studied natural history at the University of Göttingen, and following a graduate dissertation on Holothuroidea, he remained at the University of Göttingen as an assistant to Wilhelm Moritz Keferstein (1833-1870). His research was in this period mainly on the anatomy, taxonomy and embryology of marine invertebrates, especially organisms from the phylum Echinodermata. In 1868, he became a professor of zoology and comparative anatomy at Leiden University, followed by a professorship at the University of Erlangen in 1874. In 1895, he was given an honorary professorship at the Ludwig-Maximilians-Universität München. He was co-founder of the journal Biologisches Zentralblatt.

His later research was on mammals. He studied the early development of the embryo and the development of the germ layer in mammals, and did comparative anatomic research on apes, especially gibbons and orangutans. He found evidence that the lateral distribution of orangutan races was caused by geographic isolation (a process called allopatric speciation). Selenka also examined the evolution of marsupials and their morphologic relation with reptiles. One problem he was interested in, was the evolutionary relation between Australian and South American marsupials.

In order to collect material, Selenka organized expeditions to tropical countries. In 1877, he undertook an expedition to Brazil. From 1892, he led an expedition that lasted two years to Southeast Asia, it visited Ceylon, the Dutch East Indies, Japan, China and Australia. Among the participants was his second wife, the zoologist and feminist Margarethe Selenka (1860-1922), whom he married in 1893. When Selenka became severely ill during his stay in the Dutch East Indies and had to return to Germany, his wife continued exploring the jungles of Borneo by herself. The couple wrote a report of their journeys together, titled "Sonnige Welten- Ostasiatische Reiseskizzen". Other publications by Emil Selenka are:

- Beiträge zur Anatomie und Systematik der Holothurien, (1867).
- Zoologische Studien, (1878).
- Studien über Entwickelungsgeschichte der Thiere, (12 volumes, 1883–1913, with Ambrosius Hubrecht).
- "Report on the Gephyrea, collected by H.M.S. Challenger during the years 1873-1876"; (published in English, 1885).
- Zoologisches Taschenbuch für Studierende zum Gebrauch bei Vorlesungen und praktischen Übungen zusammengestellt, (1897).

Between 1873 and 1874 and again from 1889 Selenka was a member of the Royal Netherlands Academy of Arts and Sciences.

He died on 20 February 1902 in Munich.

== Literature ==
- Lubosch, W.; 1922: Emil Selenka, ein Gedenkblatt zur achtzigsten Wiederkehr seines Geburtstages am 27. Februar, Naturwissenschaften 10(8), pp 179-181.
