= Quarterdeck Office Systems =

- Founded: 1981; 45 years ago
- Founder: Therese Myers, Gary Pope
- Defunct: 1998
- Fate: Acquired by Symantec
- Successor: Symantec
- Headquarters: Marina del Rey, California, United States
- Products: Quarterdeck Expanded Memory Manager, DESQview, DESQview/X

Quarterdeck Office Systems, later Quarterdeck Corporation (NASDAQ: QDEK), was an American computer software company. It was founded by Therese Myers and Gary Pope in 1981 and incorporated in 1982. Their offices were initially located at 150 Pico Boulevard in Santa Monica, California and later at 13160 Mindanao Way in Marina del Rey, California, as well as a sales and technical support unit located in Clearwater, Florida. In the 1990s, they had a European office in Dublin, Ireland. Their most famous products were the Quarterdeck Expanded Memory Manager, DESQview, CleanSweep, DESQview/X, Quarterdeck Mosaic, Manifest and Partition-It.

On April 18, 1989, Quarterdeck was awarded a US software patent that allowed multiple windowed PC applications under MS-DOS.

After sales and its stock plummeted in 1995, interim CEO King R. Lee hired Gaston Bastiaens as CEO. In order to diversify the company's product offerings, Bastiaens began an ultimately unsuccessful acquisition spree.

In 1995, the company acquired Landmark Research International Corp. for 3.5 million shares of Quarterdeck (acquiring MagnaRAM and WinProbe) and then Inset Systems, Inc. of Brookfield, Connecticut in September of that year for 933,000 shares of Quarterdeck (acquiring HiJaak graphics software in the deal).

In March 1996, Quarterdeck acquired Datastorm Technologies, Inc., publishers of PROCOMM and PROCOMM PLUS, and relocated its technical support and development operations from California and Florida, to Datastorm's Columbia, Missouri headquarters.

In July 1996, Quarterdeck acquired Vertisoft Systems, publishers of the DoubleDisk and Fix-It utilities, also for 3.5 million shares of Quarterdeck. Both Landmark and Vertisoft had extensive revenues from direct-marketing of third party products through telemarketing and direct mail.

Bastiaens resigned in August 1996, and Quarterdeck continued under acting Co-CEOs King R. Lee, and Anatoly Tikhman, the former CEO of Vertisoft. The company announced a restructuring and a loss, and in January 1997, Quarterdeck hired Curtis Hessler to run the company.

In 1998, with its DOS utilities market all but collapsed, Quarterdeck was acquired for $0.52 per share by Symantec (the Norton Utilities company), which discontinued support of some Quarterdeck products, e.g., Mosaic, and integrated others into larger offerings, e.g., CleanSweep, which became part of Norton SystemWorks.

== List of software products ==
- CleanSweep
- DESQ, predecessor to DESQview
- DESQview (DESQ successor, with IBM TopView compatibility)
- DESQview 386 (DESQview that shipped bundled with QEMM 386)
- DESQview/X (an X based version of DESQview)
- GameRunner
- GlobalChat IRC client
- GlobalStage IRC server (run on irc.scifi.com until 2003)
- HiJaak Graphics Suite
- MagnaRAM
- Manifest
- Partition-It!
- Quarterdeck Expanded Memory Manager, formerly QEMM 386
- Quarterdeck InternetSuite
- Quarterdeck Message Center
- Quarterdeck Mosaic
- Quarterdeck Sidebar
- QRAM, an Intel 80286-based expanded memory manager
- TotalWeb
- ViruSweep
- Quarterdeck WebAuthor for Word
- WebCompass, an early metasearch tool
- WebStar (via StarNine)
- WebTalk
- Files.com
