= Abraham Pruijs van der Hoeven =

Dutch colonial governor

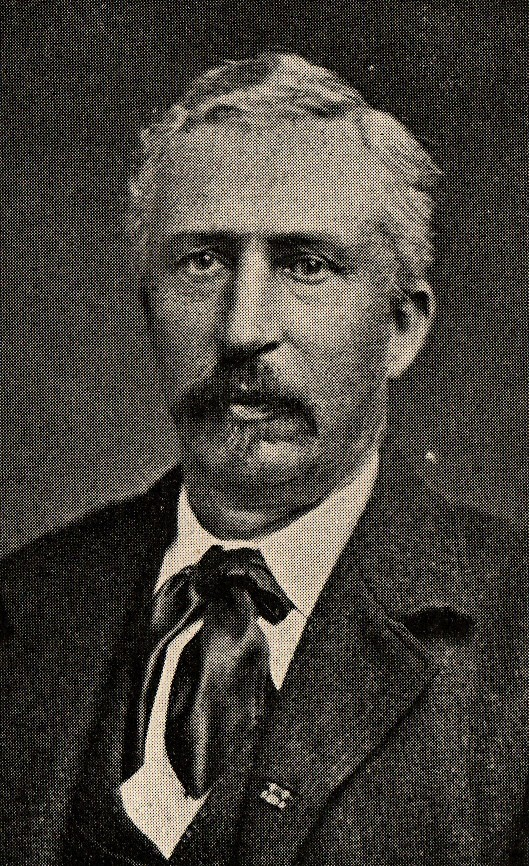
Abraham Pruijs van der Hoeven in 1900

Abraham Pruijs van der Hoeven (Leiden, 30 March 1829 - Brussels, 7 January 1907) was a governor of Nanggröe Aceh Darussalam, a northern region of the island of Sumatra.

Van der Hoeven was born in Leiden in 1829. He first went to sea as a cabin boy in 1845. By 1852, he had risen to the rank of mate. He trained to be a colonial official in 1854. In 1856 he was serving in Sumatra and in 1858 he led an expedition.

In 1870 he was assistant resident in Benkoelen and in 1873 he was resident in Palembang. From February to October 1880 he was a joint commissioner with Karel van der Heijden analyzing the situation in Aceh, Sumatra. Their report called for the pacification of this troublesome area and he was appointed governor in 1881. The area erupted in violence after which he left office in March 1883.

In 1886, he served on the Dutch Council for India. He retired in 1893. He died in Brussels in 1907 after retiring to Europe.
