= Olga Zelenkova =

Soviet swimmer

Personal information
- Born: 1967 (age 58–59) Saint Petersburg, Russia

Sport
- Sport: Swimming
- Club: Zenit
Medal record
Swimming
European Championships
Representing Soviet Union
Bronze medal – third place	1983 Rome	200 m breaststroke

Olga Zelenkova (Russian: Ольга Зеленкова; born 1967) is a retired Russian breaststroke swimmer who won a bronze medal in the 200 m breastroke event at the 1983 European Aquatics Championships.
