= Kerio Technologies =

American software company

Kerio Technologies, Inc.

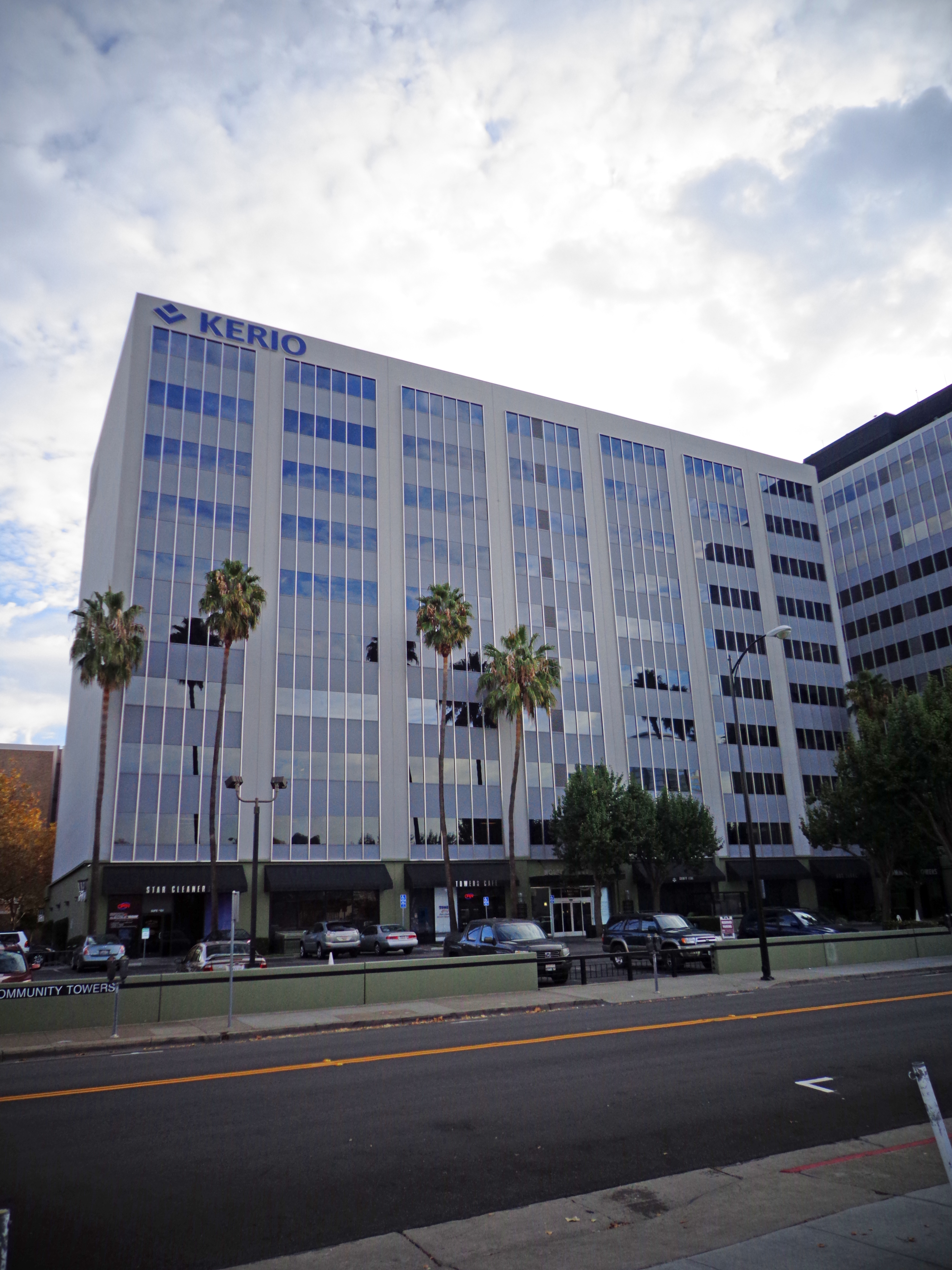
- Headquarters in San Jose, California
- Type: Private
- Industry: Information technology Software; Network security
- Founded: 2001; 25 years ago
- Fate: Acquired by GFI Software
- Headquarters: San Jose, California, United States
- Key people: Mirek Kren (CEO)
- Products: Kerio Connect, Kerio Control, Kerio Operator, Samepage
- Number of employees: 200
- Website: kerio.com

Kerio Technologies, Inc. was a technology company specializing in collaboration software and unified threat management for small and medium organizations. Founded in 1997, Kerio is headquartered in San Jose, California.

In January 2017, GFI Software acquired Kerio. GFI Software is owned by Aurea SMB Solutions, which in turn is owned by ESW Capital Group.

== History ==
Kerio Technologies incorporated in 2001, but its first product WinRoute Pro entered the Internet security market in 1997, as it was owned and maintained by Tiny Software until February 1, 2002. Tiny Software then transferred sales and development of its software to Kerio, where the developers continued to work on it under the Kerio brand.

In the early 2000s, Kerio's main products were Kerio Personal Firewall and Kerio WinRoute Firewall and the company focused on collaboration software with Kerio MailServer. Kerio discontinued its Personal Firewall in late 2005, which was then acquired by Sunbelt Software.

Starting in 2010, Kerio MailServer was renamed to Kerio Connect and Kerio WinRoute to Kerio Control. Kerio introduced Kerio Operator, an IP PBX system, in 2011 and Samepage, a file sharing and collaboration software, in 2013.

In January 2017, Kerio was bought by GFI Software. Kerio Connect, Kerio Control, Kerio Operator and Kerio Cloud became GFI assets. Samepage was not part of the GFI acquisition and was later acquired by Paylocity in 2020.

== Products and services ==
Kerio provides IT products and services mainly in security solutions which are physical devices and virtual appliance that could run on virtualization platforms such as VMware vSphere.

=== Kerio Control ===
Kerio Control is a network security solution that manages security services and perform as Unified Threat Management such as intrusion detection and prevention (IPS), gateway antivirus, VPN, web content, application filtering and endpoint security software.

In November 2024, a major vulnerability was discovered that could allow for remote code execution, affecting versions 9.2.5 through 9.4.5. Additional patches were released in January 2025.

=== Kerio Connect ===
Kerio Connect provides email service for small and mid-sized businesses. Some of its features include security features such as SSL encryption, S/MIME and antispam. Supporting for Microsoft Outlook, and mail services IMAP and POP.
