= Mikuláš Medek =

Czech painter (1926–1974)

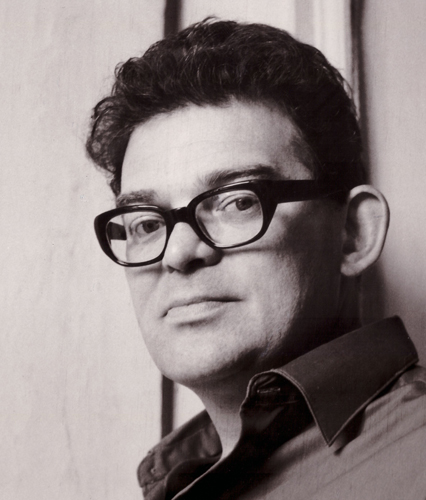
- Emila Medková - Mikuláš Medek, Genoa, 1967
- Born: 3 November 1926; Prague, Czechoslovakia
- Died: 23 August 1974 (aged 47); Prague, Czechoslovakia
- Education: Academy of Arts and Crafts in Prague, expelled from studies for political reasons
- Known for: Painter
- Spouse: Emila Medková
- Children: 1
- Parents: Rudolf Medek (father); Eva Slavíčková (mother)
- Relatives: Ivan Medek, brother
- Awards: First prize for painting, Lignano, 1968, State Prize, 1969, Medal of Merit (Czech Republic), 1st Grade, 1996

Mikuláš Medek (3 November 1926 – 23 August 1974) was a Czech painter. He united the artistic tradition of over three generations and thanks to the originality of his expression, depth and spirituality of his extraordinary work, he occupies one of the most prominent places in the Czech art history of the post-war period. Medek's entire work must be perceived in the context of the times, as it directly reflects the oppressive atmosphere of the communist regime in Czechoslovakia. He worked freely only for a short period between 1963 and 1969 and had only two exhibitions in Prague during his lifetime.

He was the grandson of the impressionist Antonín Slavíček, the son of the general and writer Rudolf Medek and the brother of Ivan Medek. Medek's studio was one of the meeting centres for artists and art historians during the communist rule in Czechoslovakia.

== Life ==
=== 1926–1960 ===
Mikuláš Medek was the son of Rudolf Medek, a teacher, legionnaire and brigadier general of the Czechoslovak Army, and Eva Medek, née Slavíčková. He was the grandson of the painter Antonín Slavíček. He had a sister, Eva (1921-1924), who died tragically as a child, and an older brother , Ivan (1925-2010). His grandmother Bohumila Slavíčková was married for the second time to Herbert Masaryk, and Mikuláš's aunts were her two daughters - art historian Anna Masaryk and Herberta Masaryk, married to art historian Emanuel Poche. Her daughter Charlotta, was married to Petr Kotik, son of the painter Jan Kotík. Mikuláš Medek maintained friendly relations with his uncle, the film director Jiří Slavíček. Rudolf Medek wrote a five-volume chronicle of the Czechoslovak Legions, published legionary short stories, wrote poems for Moderní revue, and was the author of film scripts and the play Plukovník Švec, which was staged by the National Theatre. A debating club of intellectuals and artists of a wide range of political views - from Catholic poets to communists - met in the Medeks' apartment. Rudolf Medek was friends with General Jan Syrový, the architect Strnad, Bishop Antonín Podlaha, the writers Josef Kopta and Viktor Dyk, and the poets Jaroslav Seifert, František Halas, Josef Hora, Josef Palivec, Jaroslav Durych, Jan Zahradníček, Josef Kostohryz, and others. Mikuláš's mother was also literary active.

From 1929, the Medeks lived in a service apartment in the National Monument at Vítkov, where Rudolf Medek was the director. In 1939, the Gestapo took the apartment, and the family spent a year in their country house in Čejkovice and then from 1940 lived in an apartment at 49 Janáček Embankment in Prague. Rudolf Medek deliberately asked to be hospitalized at Bulovka hospital to escape arrest, but died of peritonitis in August 1940. In 1943, the Nazis occupied their house in Čejkovice and then the Red Army took it over.

Mikuláš Medek graduated from primary school in Karlín and then attended the Academic grammar school until 1942. At that time, he was mainly interested in literature and was going to study biology, but the universities were closed during the war. In the fourth year of grammar school, his interest in fine arts prevailed, and he transferred to the State Graphic School in Prague. He studied under Prof. K. Müller, where his classmates included Jan Hladík, Vladimír Fuka, Vlastimil Sova and Václav Sivko. In the last year of the war, the whole class was "totally deployed" in the Dorka cooperative, where they knitted bags. In May 1945, as a member of an illegal student group, he took part in the Prague uprising with the defenders of the Old Town Hall, and after it was set on fire, he escaped through the sewers. In the summer of 1945, he was admitted to the Academy of Fine Arts in the studio of Prof. V. Minář and V. Rada. After the first semester, he transferred to the studio of František Muzika at the Academy of Arts and Crafts and in 1947, he moved to the studio of František Tichý. His classmates were Zbyněk Sekal, Stanislav Podhrázský and Josef Lehoučka. Mikuláš and his mother joined the Communist Party in 1945, but after the 1948 Czechoslovak coup d'état, they both left. During the purges organised by the communist students, Mikuláš Medek was expelled from the Academy of Arts and Crafts in 1949.

Before the end of the war, two girls whose parents were taken to a concentration camp by the Nazis lived with the Medeks - Jana Krejcarová, Milena Jesenská's daughter, and Gabriela Dvořáková, a student at Academy of Arts and Crafts, with whom Mikuláš Medek fell in love and married in 1947. At the same time, Josef Lehoučka introduced him to Emila Tláskalová, and the two began a love affair that deepened the following year when they spent their holidays together. At the beginning of 1949, Mikuláš Medek divorced, and in September 1951, he married Emila. In 1952, a daughter, Eva (Iviska), was born to the couple. Mikuláš's family lived in a shared apartment with Ivan's family and with his mother, who married a second time to the lawyer J. Velkoborský, at 49 Janáček Embankment in Prague. One of the two living rooms also served as a studio and a meeting place for Medek's friends. Emila Medková was employed as a photographer at the Institute of Human Work, and her daughter was looked after by Mikuláš on weekdays or stayed with her grandmother Emilie Tláskalová, and her parents commuted to see her.

After being expelled from school, Medek found himself in social isolation and existential worries. His unfinished studies meant that he could not become a freelance artist, he was threatened with being drafted for two years of compulsory military service, and he had to look for a job. A difficult period followed, when he worked for several months at a revolver lathe in the Škoda engineering plant in Smíchov (1950) and finally had a nervous breakdown and was hospitalized at Bulovka. He avoided military service when he inflicted a knife wound to his chest. In the following years, he received occasional commissions in the field of applied book graphics, as a poster designer for the circus or as a painter of decorations. The artists were commissioned and supplied with painting materials by Jaroslav Puchmertl, a sculptor and former member of the Ra group who was employed by the Central Committee of the National Front.

Mikuláš Medek never gave up his work for the sake of commissions for a living, which developed without interruption from the mid-1940s. In 1945, he exhibited two paintings for the first time at a student exhibition and became acquainted with Libor Fára and, through him, with the circle of the Spořilov surrealists. From 1949 onwards, he was in contact with Vladimír Boudník, Bohumil Hrabal and his circle (Egon Bondy) and Jiří Kolář. In 1951, Emila and Mikuláš Medek joined the group of surrealists around Karel Teige and participated in the samizdat editions Znamení zvěrokruhu (Signs of the Zodiac) and Object and the questionnaires on surrealism organized by Vratislav Effenberger. The whole group of surrealists was monitored and eavesdropped on by the secret police (Action: Mazalové), and several StB collaborators were in the vicinity of Mikuláš Medek and reported on him (Egon Bondy, Jaroslav Puchmertl, Josef Vyleťal, Stanislav Drvota).

In 1955 and 1956, together with Zdeněk Palcr and Stanislav Podhrázský, he worked as a fresco restorer in Strakonice and Klatovy. In 1957, he submitted drawings for the tapestry manufactory in Valašské Meziříčí, which the company eventually failed to realise; he illustrated books under a pseudonym. The first articles about Medek's work were published in 1956 by the Polish Przegląd Artystyczny and a year later by Ludmila Vachtová in the magazine Tvar. In the same year, he met Václav Havel, Jiří Kuběna and Josef Topol. In 1958, three of Medek's paintings were exhibited for two days at the Faculty of Arts and Ludmila Vachtová introduced him to the theoreticians František Šmejkal and Zdenek Felix. He became friends with Jan Koblasa and the Šmidra group. Through Herberta Masaryk, the following year he met the composers Krzysztof Penderecki, Józef Patkowski and Luigi Nono. Medek's requests for exhibition dates were permanently rejected at that time, and he was also excluded from all group exhibitions. In 1960, Ludmila Vachtová submitted an article about five Czech painters (Medek, Istler, Koblasa, Kotík, Sklenář) to the review La Biennale di Venezia. The article was the first report on Czech contemporary art in the West, and Vachtová was investigated by the StB and fired from the editorship of the magazine Výtvarné umění.

=== 1961–1969 ===
Artists and theoreticians who met at Mikuláš Medek's flat have tried to register the creative group Konfrontace (Confrontation). In early 1961, a series of arrests and interrogations took place, and members of the group were bugged. The application for registration made in 1961, as well as requests for exhibition dates in 1962 and 1963, went unanswered, and the group gradually disbanded. Only in 1962, thanks to theoretician Jan Kříž, were Medek's paintings presented in Vimperk and Kamenice nad Lipou at exhibitions, organized by the Aleš South Bohemian Gallery in Hluboká nad Vltavou. In the same year he was represented at the exhibition Arguments 62 at the Krzywe Koło Gallery in Warsaw, prepared by Marian Bogusz.

The situation changed when in 1963 Medek received a number of public commissions for architecture - painting for the Czech Airlines office in Damascus, a monumental pano for the Czech Airlines hall in Košice, and an altarpiece for Jedovnice. He was accepted as a candidate of the Czechoslovak Union of Artists and in August he had his first major exhibition of paintings at the Teplice Castle together with the sculptor Jan Koblasa. The following year he exhibited three paintings at the D exhibition in the Nová síň Gallery in Prague, but the exhibition was not allowed to be accompanied by a catalogue or by a review in the art magazine. The exhibition Imaginative Painting 1930-1950, prepared in 1964 at the Aleš South Bohemian Gallery in Hluboká nad Vltavou by Věra Linhartová and František Šmejkal, was banned by the regional committee of the Communist Party of Czechoslovakia and was not open to the public. Only after the reform of the Union of Czechoslovak Visual Artists in December 1964 and the election of a new presidium headed by Adolf Hoffmeister was Mikuláš Medek accepted as a member and elected as an alternate member of its central committee. At the end of 1964, he won first prize in a competition for the decoration of the new airport building in Prague-Ruzyně and was commissioned to paint two paintings for the Czech Airlines office in Paris (one of the paintings was installed in Prague Castle after 1989).

In 1965, he had his first solo exhibition of paintings from 1947 to 1965 in Prague's Nová síň Gallery and was represented at several exhibitions of contemporary Czech art in Western Europe (Bochum, Baden-Baden, Celle, Paris, Munich, Liége, Rotterdam, L'Aquila), at the Salon of Youth in Paris, the San Marino Biennial and the European Forum in Alpbach, Linz and Graz. He was diagnosed with diabetes, for which he was frequently hospitalised in the following years.

In 1966, he was given a spacious studio in Letná after the communist painter Jan Čumpelík and received his first passport. His paintings were part of important exhibitions of modern Czech art in Prague (Spring Exhibition, Mánes, Current Tendencies, AICA Congress, Symbols of Monstrosity, Gallery D) and abroad (West Berlin, Mexico City, Lausanne, Brussels, Worpswede, Skopje). Together with Emila he visited West Berlin, Worpswede, Bremen and Hamburg. He received an award from the publishing house Blok for his illustrations of Otakar Březina's book Hands and designed, together with Josef Wagner, the set for Josef Topol's play Nightingale for Dinner for Divadlo za branou theatre. He had small exhibitions in Ústí nad Orlicí and Liberec, but Medek's planned exhibition at the House of Arts in Brno did not take place.

The following year, at the invitation of the La Bertesca Gallery, he spent four weeks in Genoa with Emila and produced paintings and drawings which he exhibited there in June 1967 at his very first solo exhibition abroad. On the occasion of the exhibition in Celle, he travelled for two weeks through northern German cities and took part in further exhibitions in Kiel, Soest, Turin, Stockholm, The Hague, Bucharest, Antwerp and Copenhagen.

In 1968 he again spent several weeks in Genoa and exhibited twelve paintings made there at the Chisel Gallery. With Emila he visited Hamelin and Celle. He was represented at international exhibitions in Dortmund, Namur, Rijeka, Copenhagen, Rome, at the May Salon in Paris and in Lignano, where he won the first prize for painting. In Prague he was invited to the exhibition of 300 painters, sculptors and graphic artists of 5 generations to celebrate 50 years of the Republic. The director Jan Iván made a film about Medek and Aleš Veselý called The Road to Abstraction.

In 1969, he realized the composition Signals for the new building of the Prague-Ruzyně airport and received the State Prize for his series Designers of Towers, exhibited in the Václav Špála Gallery. In addition, he had solo exhibitions at the Regional Gallery in Hradec Králové, Galleria La Bertesca in Genoa, the City Museum in Regensburg and was represented at exhibitions in Paris, Rome, Brno, and Jihlava (Phases). The family moved to Šumavská Street in Vinohrady.

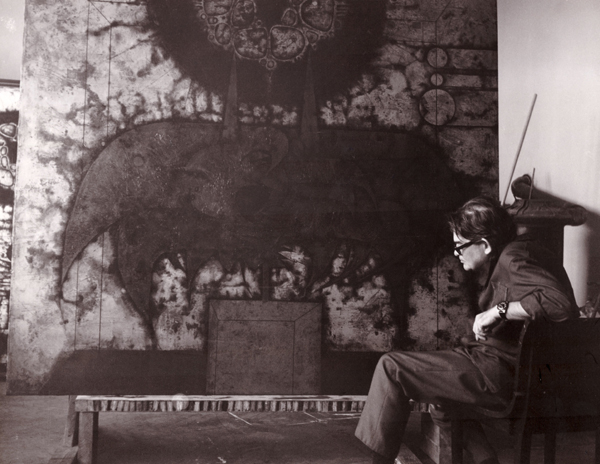
Emila Medková - last photograph of Mikuláš Medek, Letná studio (1973)

=== 1970–1974 ===
After the Warsaw Pact invasion of Czechoslovakia and the onset of "normalization", Medek found himself on the index again, his works in gallery exhibitions were removed and placed in a depository, he was not allowed to exhibit, and his contracts for architectural commissions were cancelled. From 1970 onwards, Medek's work was presented only abroad (Hamburg, 1970, Leinfelden, 1970, Zürich, 1976, Bochum, 1976). Medek's monograph, prepared in 1970 by Bohumír Mráz for the publishing house Obelisk, was withdrawn from sale and ended up in the pulp-mill.

Due to worsening diabetes, he was hospitalized several times during 1970 and again in 1972. Emila Medková gave up her job to care for Mikuláš. In 1973, he submitted two paintings for the InterContinental Hotel, but they were rejected on the grounds that they were "in stark contradiction to the mission of art in a socialist society". Diabetes also manifested itself in thinning bones, and in 1974 Mikuláš Medek suffered a fractured hip joint, after which he could no longer attend the studio. In June 1974, the family moved to a ground-floor apartment at 6 Estonská Street, Prague. Mikuláš Medek was taken to the hospital and operated on 21 August 1974, but died two days after the operation, on 23 August 1974, in the hospital. He is buried in the Olšany Cemetery.

Ivan Medek remembered him in 1978: "Mikuláš was an incredibly gentle and sensitive brother. A terribly beautiful person. I don't know who could have endured what he did - physically and mentally."

=== Exhibitions after 1974 ===
A posthumous exhibition of Medek's last paintings was held in his studio in 1975 by Emila. It was visited by many of Medek's friends, including Václav Havel and his wife Olga. A posthumous exhibition on the occasion of Medek's 50th birthday was organized by Jan Koblasa and Petr Spielmann at the Museum Bochum in 1976. In the last years of normalization, Mikuláš Medek returned to the public consciousness thanks to an exhibition organised by Antonín Hartmann in 1988 in the Gallery of Modern Art in Roudnice nad Labem. The exhibition was accompanied by a catalogue that presented 60 paintings as a representative cross-section of Medek's work from 1944 to 1974. In September 1989, a more modest exhibition was held at the Aš Town Museum.

In 1990, after the fall of the communist regime, monographic exhibitions of Mikuláš Medek were held in regional galleries in Prague, Brno, Hluboká, Jihlava, Olomouc and Ostrava. A major retrospective exhibition, prepared by Bohumír Mráz (†2001) and Antonín Hartmann and accompanied by a narrative catalogue, was held in 2002 at the Rudolfinum Gallery. A retrospective of Mikuláš Medek was prepared in 2020 by the National Gallery in the Wallenstein Riding Hall, the Convent of Saint Agnes and the Trade Fair Palace.

== Work ==
During his lifetime, Mikuláš Medek was recognized not only as a painter, but also for his strong intellect, deep artistic and literary education, moral firmness, modesty and selflessness. In the times that were moving away from painting and saw modernity in other areas of artistic expression, his work was considered an elevation and celebration of the hanging picture. Although he worked as a solitaire in the Czech environment, he became part of a whole current of world painting, which, after the exhaustion of the vigour of lyrical abstraction and after the late branches of surrealism fell into academicism, found its way out of the crisis in a new integrity of the world view and the participation of all components of the artist's psychophysical activity in the creative process. Medek's work is marked by a continuous tension, the source of which was dreams and traumatic childhood experiences, disturbing bodily feelings and self-destructive behaviour, as well as the immediate cultural and political situation, especially the complete isolation of Czechoslovakia from Western culture in 1948–1956. He was deeply influenced by the literary works of Ladislav Klíma, Franz Kafka and Richard Weiner, his relationship with Emila and his friendships with Zbyněk Sekal, Libor Fára and Jan Koblasa. Medek wrote surrealist poems and worked as an illustrator, scenographer and, last but not least, a theorist and interpreter of modern art and an innovator of painting technique. His work can be divided into several periods, which follow each other seamlessly.

=== Early work (1942–1949) ===
At the beginning of World War II, Mikuláš Medek was preparing to study biology and later used his drawings of details of flowers and animal tissues in his surrealist paintings. At the same time, his first painting experiments were based on the paintings of Antonín Slavíček and reproductions of modern French painters. His relationship to Christianity, later encouraged by Medek's interest in medieval panel painting, was also evident in his juvenile work. Already at the age of sixteen, he executed several expressive, almost Rouault-like tempera drawings with New Testament and literary themes. While studying at the School of Graphic Arts, he tried his hand at cubism and oil mannerist painting in the style of El Greco, with its strong use of colour. The beginning of his work is associated with surrealism. The latter was attractive to him as the last programmatic avant-garde movement operating without regard for borders and resonating with the revolutionary mood of society in the second half of the 1940s, with its leftist orientation.

The paintings from the surrealist period include quotations from the works of Paul Klee, Miró, Yves Tanguy and Max Ernst, but the subjects come from the sphere of Medek's immediate interests - botany and zoology. He created several series of paintings on the theme of The World of an Onion (1944-1946), Infantile Walk (1946-1947), Infantile Landscape (1947), and Miraculous Mother (1948-1949). The picture plane in The World of an Onion consists of several separated and framed details of real or imaginary tissues on the principle of a picture within a picture. They are painted in oil, by an old master technique, with careful execution of details. By adding sand to the oil paint, he formed plastic structures. In subsequent cycles, he composed seemingly unrelated fragments of reality on the picture surface according to the surrealist principle, creating a poetic collage of them, connected by geometric elements and arrows (Infantile Landscape, 1947). Sections of various tissues and organs, microscopic images of cells, protozoa, crustaceans, and details of the human body (Miraculous Mother III, 1948) are the subject of the paintings.

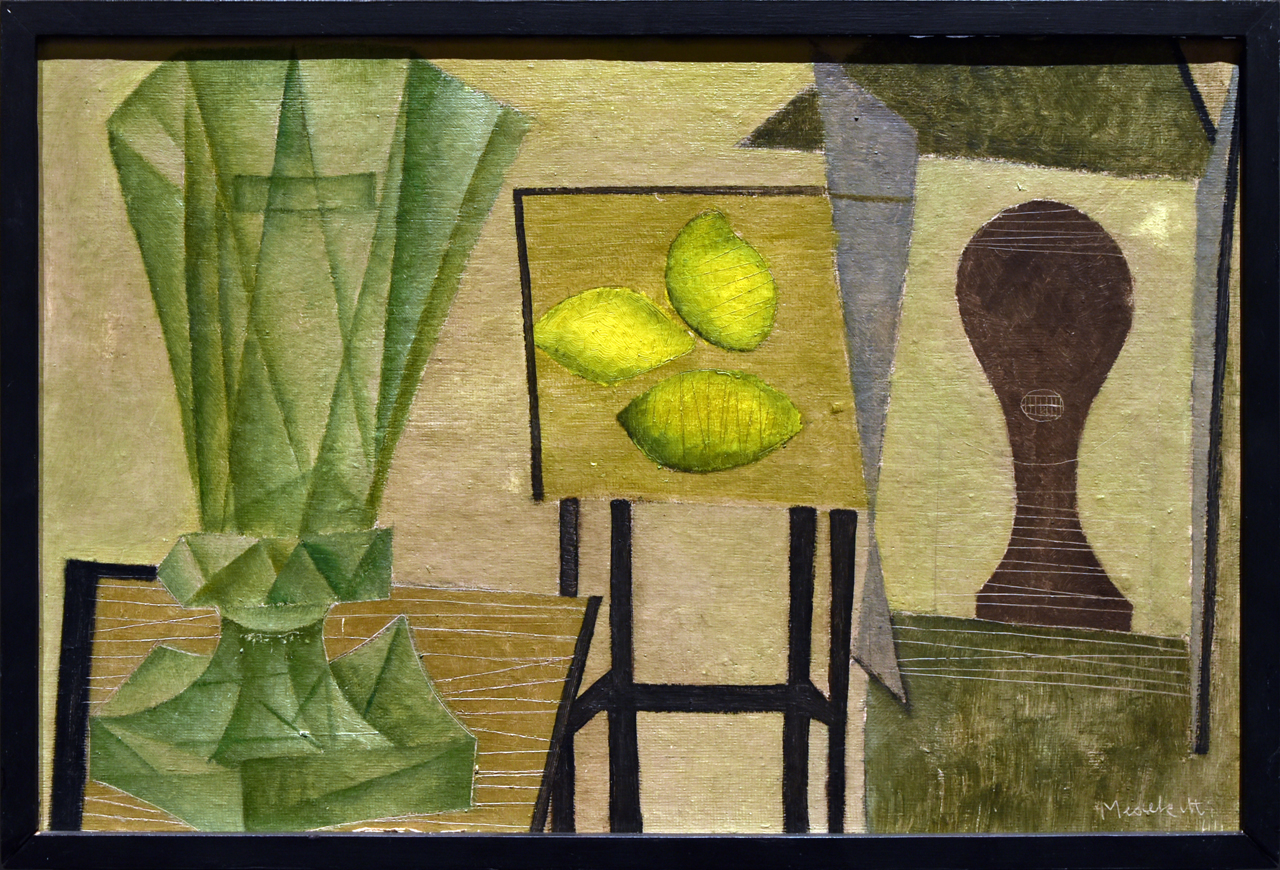
Mikuláš Medek, Still life with Green Vase (1944)

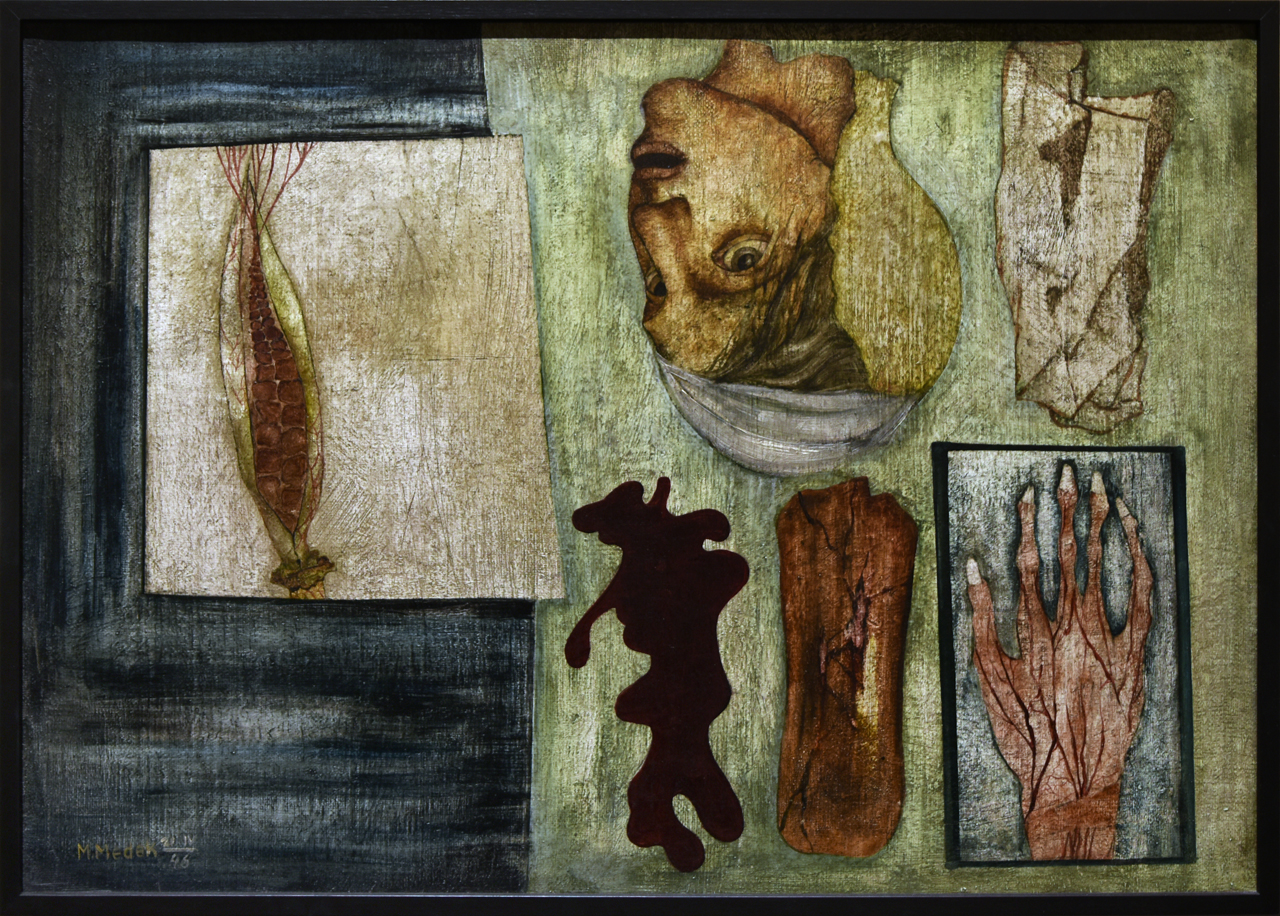
Mikuláš Medek, Untitled - Corn (1946)

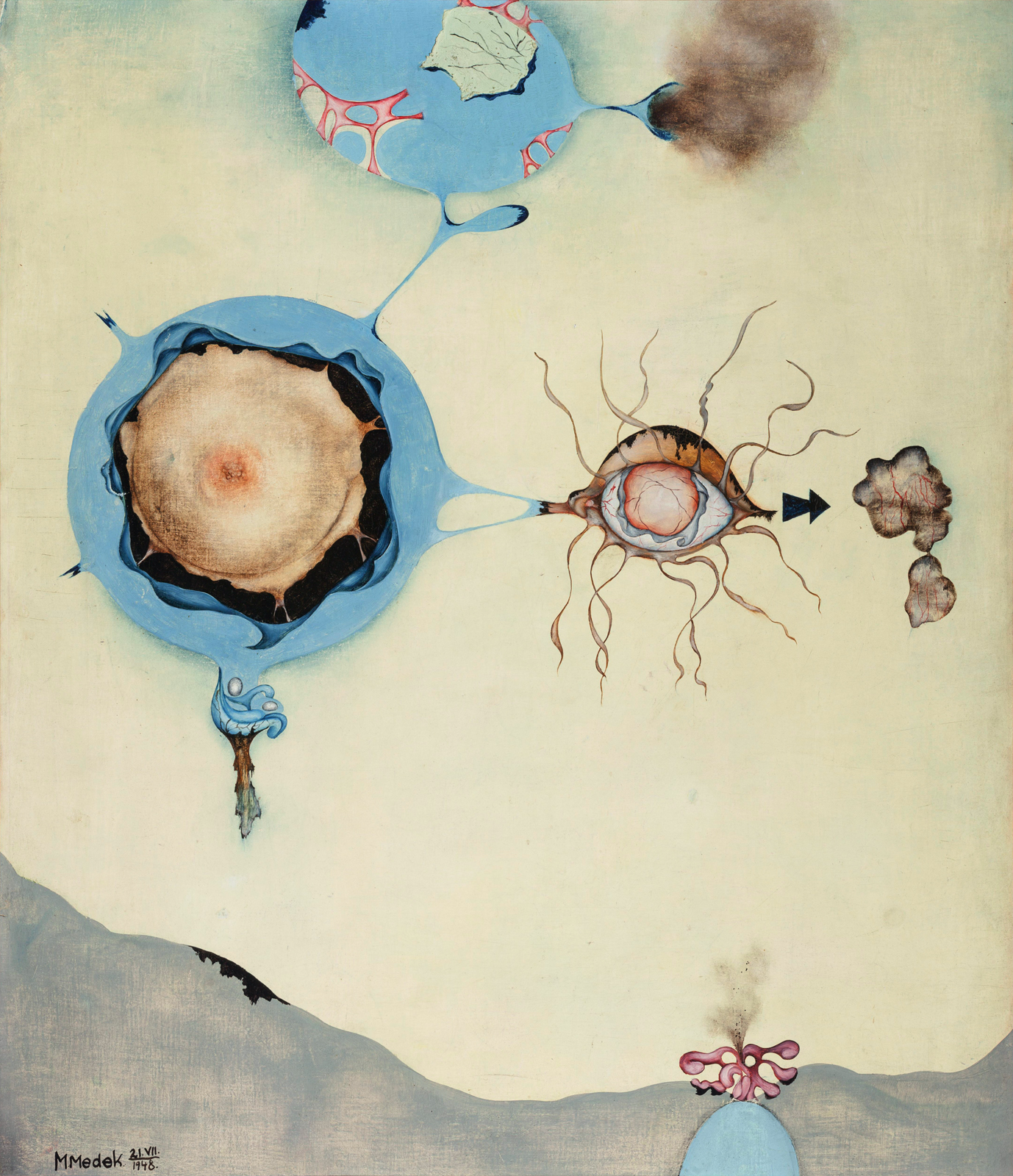
Mikuláš Medek, Miraculous Mother II (1948), National Gallery in Prague

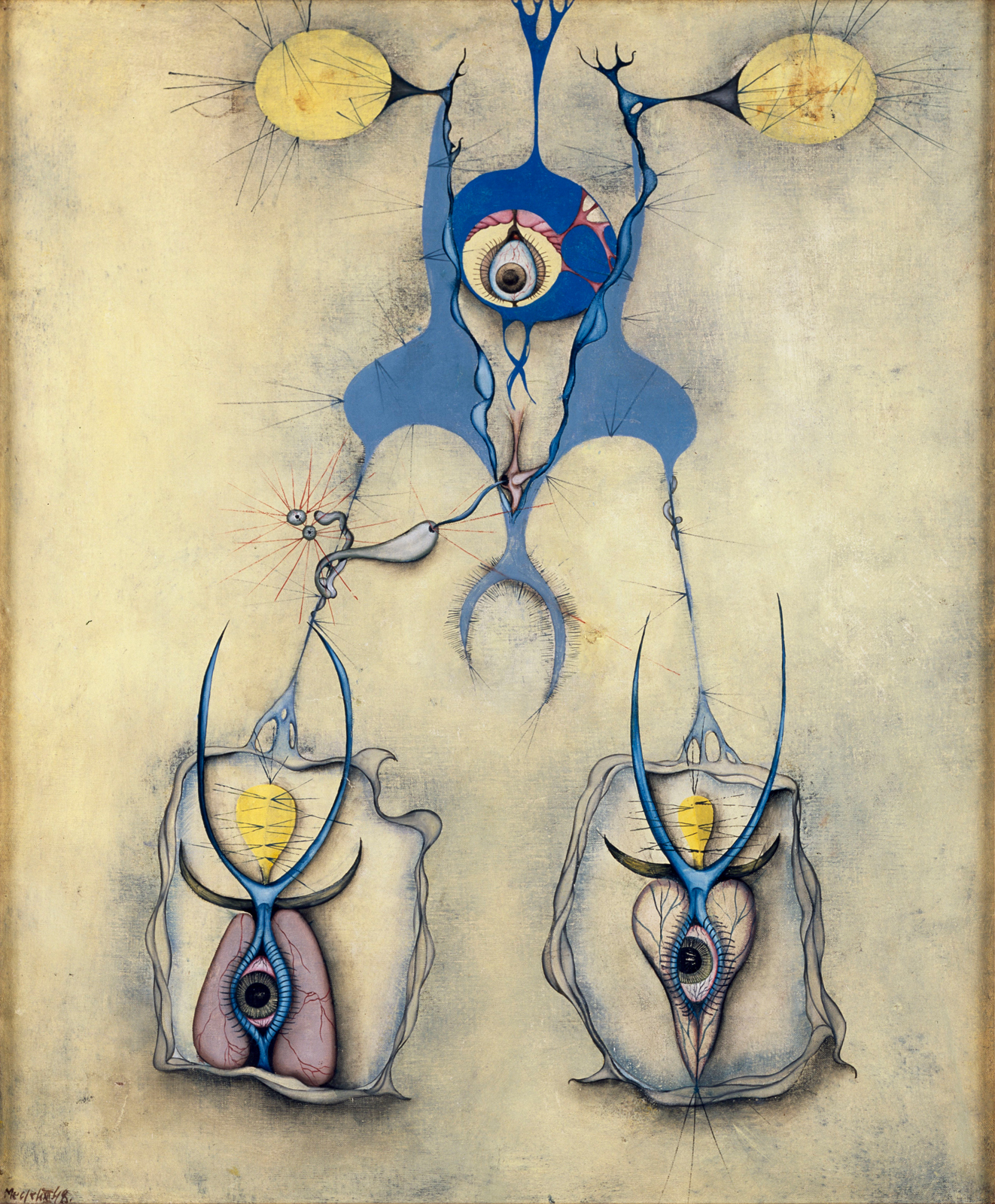
Mikuláš Medek, Miraculous Mother III (1948), Aleš South Bohemian Gallery in Hluboká nad Vltavou

=== Imaginative painting (1949–1951) ===
Medek did not participate in post-war group life and had reservations about the Ra group and the surrealist group around Karel Teige. He completely rejected the orthodox conception of surrealism and the occultism that surrealism as represented by André Breton had resulted in. Although he eventually became a member of the Surrealist group along with Emila in 1951, he stated in questionnaires that he did not consider himself a surrealist and intended to celebrate consciousness as a sibling of reality. In painting, he drew on the magical realism of Toyen, Magritte and Dalí to create compositions put together of fragments of reality into new units of meaning. The paintings are characterized by precise drawing and a maximally illusionistic rendering in smooth flowing oil paint. The post-war psychosis of the militant communist regime, its constant haunting of nuclear conflict, political trials and Soviet gulags seemed so horrifying to him that surrealism was no longer a program, but the starting point of a new poetry that conveyed an analytical image of reality in full intensity.

Medek's images of this period are expressions of the sadism or masochism of the real world, unclouded by the hypocritical veil of everyday life conventions. The elements of this cruelty consist of claws, sharp beaks of predators, mouths with venomous teeth, eyes hanging from a fishing rod, axes, forks, razors, knives, arrows, revolvers, mouths and breasts wounded with razor and knife or sewn together with rope, flames, strands of hair and smouldering ashes. Medek's poetic texts often anticipate the painter's realisation (the poem and painting Magnetic Fish, 1949, the "forehead full of screaming birds" from the poem Trapped in a Window in the painting Feast I, 1950). From these he creates situations in which he tests his ability to shock the viewer by referring to a particular horrifying social situation of the early 1950s (Mikuláš Medek: ...they went to execute each of us and then changed their minds...). The poem "In Closed Rooms..." (1949) contains numerous comments on the wartime fate of the Jews and has its counterpart in the painting Smiles of Noon (1950).

At this stage, the motif in the painting creates an imaginative space, the illusiveness of which is betrayed by its direct connection to the objects that escape from or conquer it against the backdrop of a cracked wall, torn and burning paper, or the sky. The veristic rendering by means of illusionistic painting enhances the realism of the poetic vision. The simultaneity of visions and the hallucinatory penetration of the object by the object constitute the essence of the poetic phantasmagoria of the Feast cycle.

Medek's painting The Noise of Silence is precisely dated and coincides with the day of Milada Horáková's execution on 27 June 1950. The painting can be interpreted as a scene of imminent horror - three rods with eyes - three gallows (Jan Buchal, Záviš Kalandra, Oldřich Pecl), the fourth gallows - a rod stuck in a mouth cut open with a razor against the background of a woman's torso (Milada Horáková). All the symbols of the executed ascend to the heavens, piles of ashes smouldering on the ledge (the bodies of the executed were burnt), a locust hatches from the torso as a Dalí-like symbol of gluttony and destruction.

Absolute feelings of doom and existential distress are demonstrated in the paintings Prolapsed Mother (1949) and Spring ´51, or the almost realistic painting of a skinned rabbit based on Emily's photograph (1951). Medek realised that surrealism did not have the means to adequately describe the listless, distressing, absurd and indifferent to all questions of the subject reality in which man found himself (in: survey on surrealism, January 1951). This whole period of Medek's painting is closed by the picture A Miller's Passion (1951), in which some surrealist props are left in a window niche next to a scratched wall.

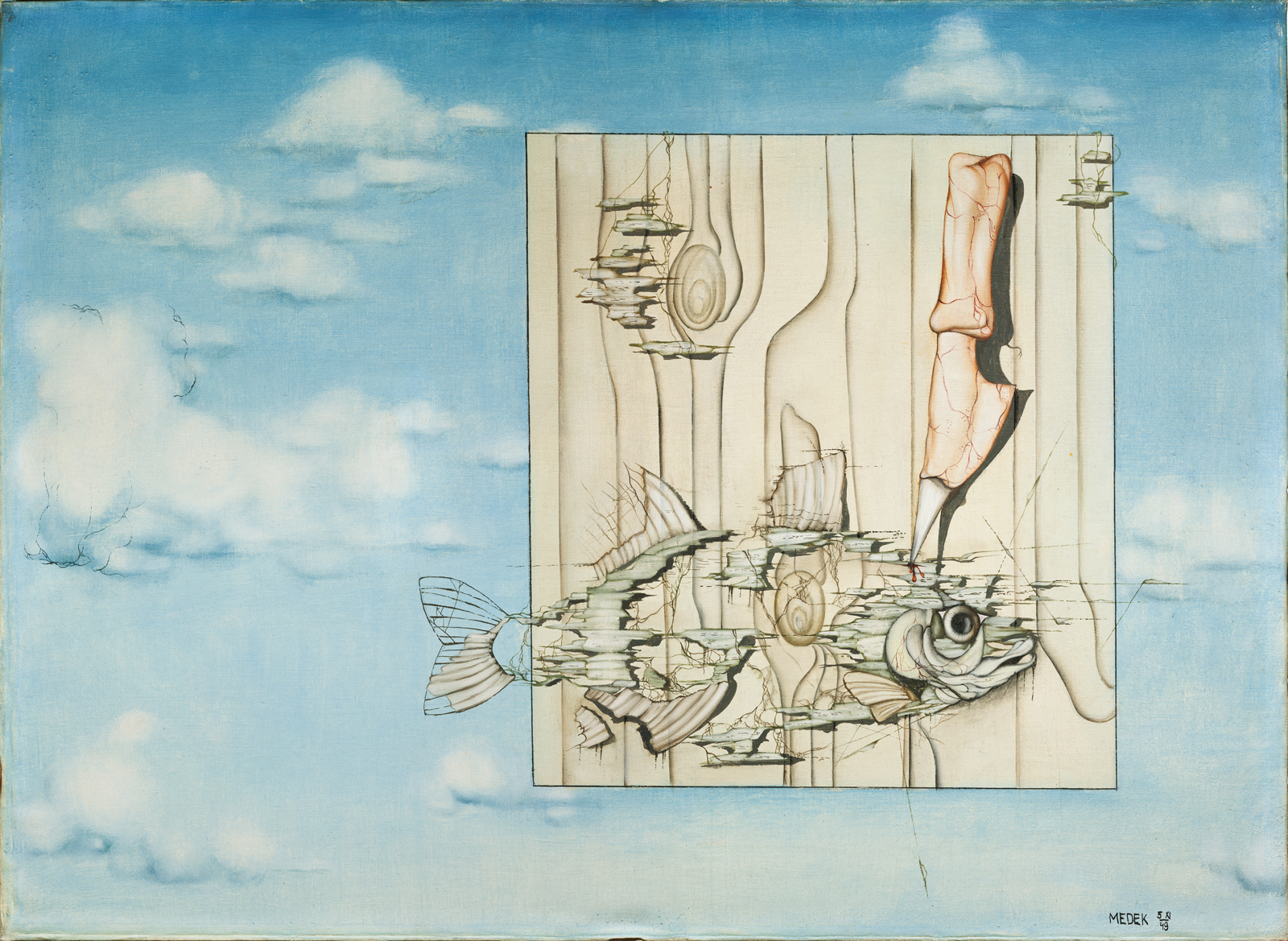
Mikuláš Medek, Magnetic Fish (1949), Národní galerie v Praze

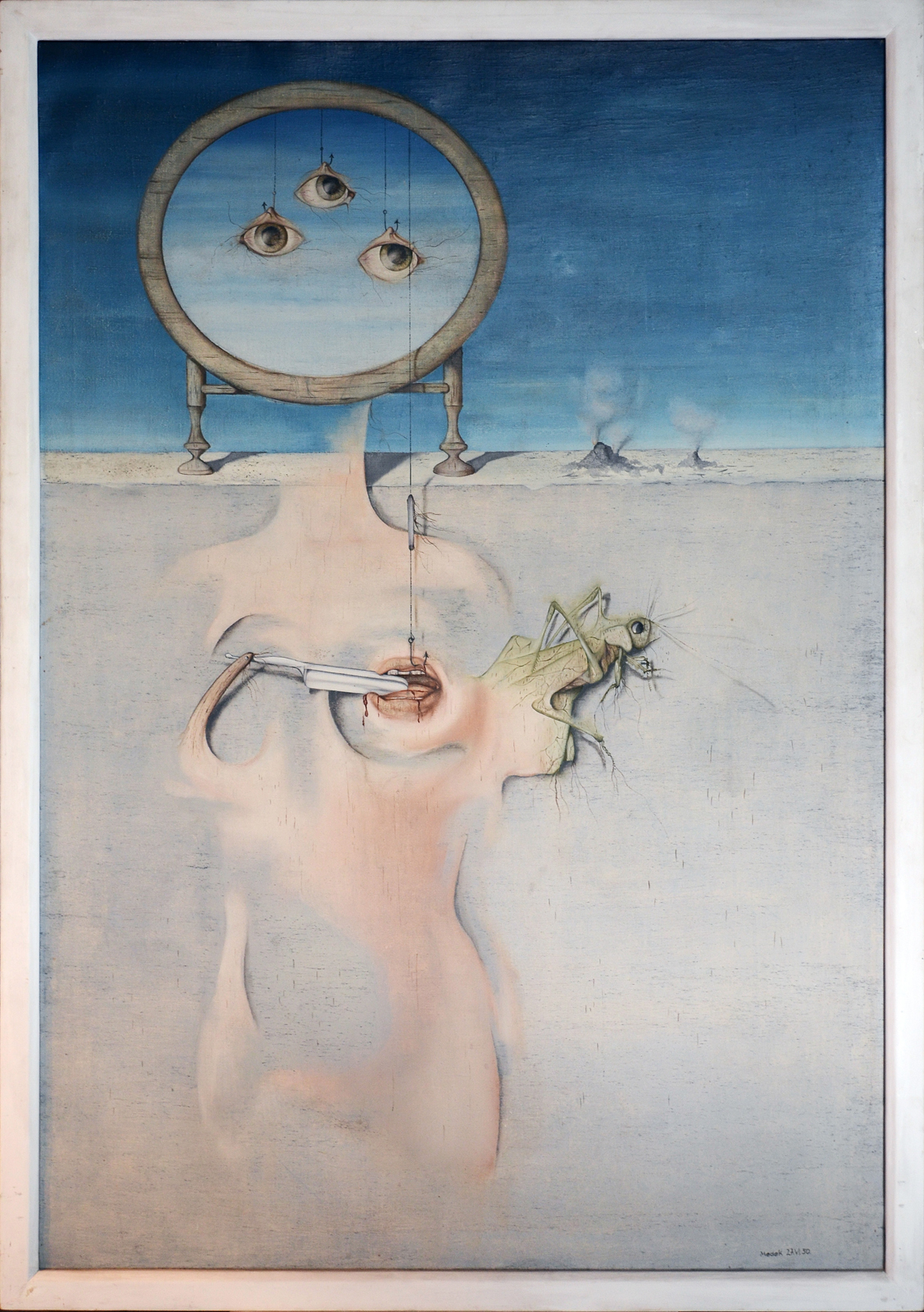
Mikuláš Medek, The Noise of Silence (27. 7.1950), Museum Bochum

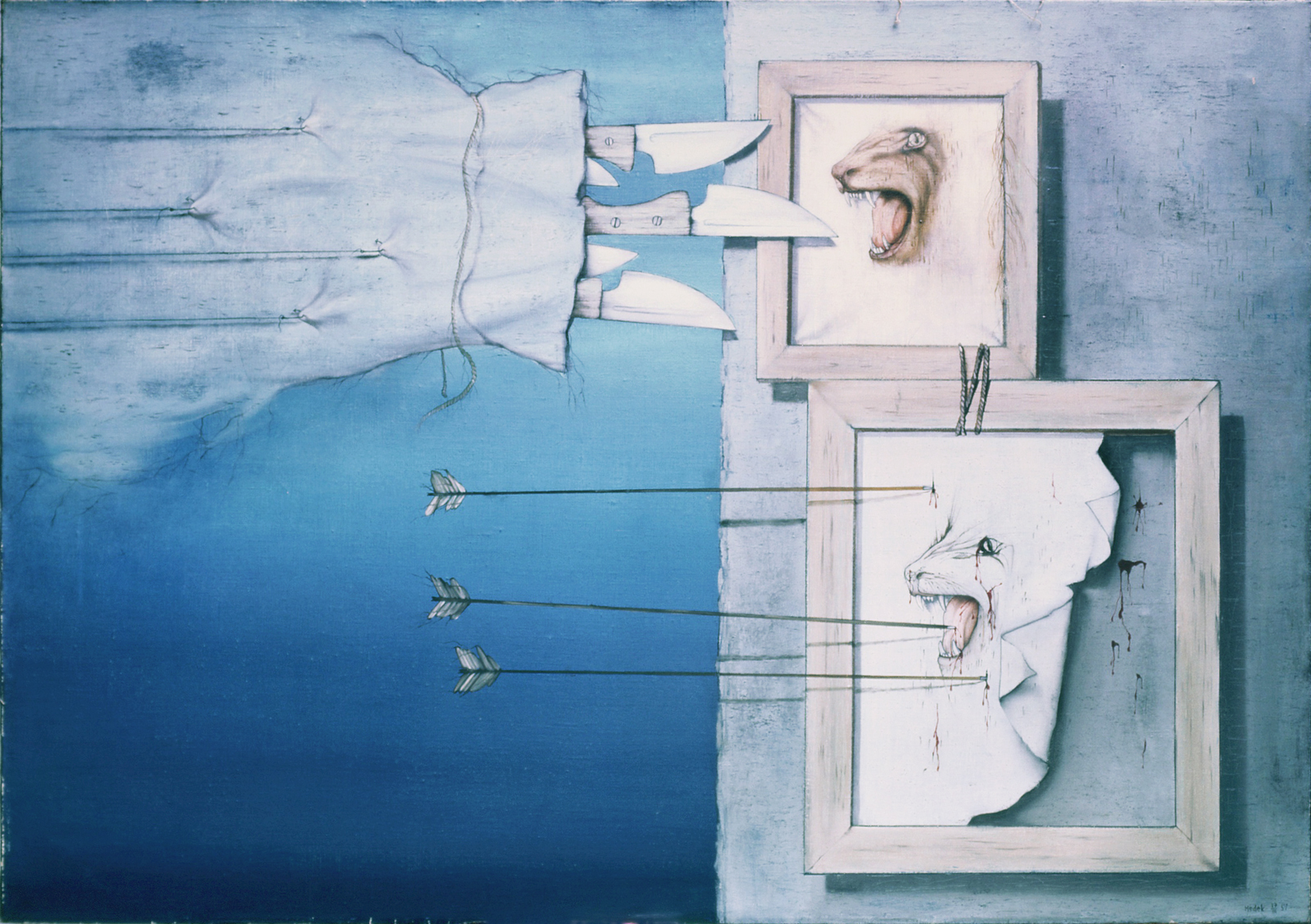
Mikuláš Medek, Spring (1951)

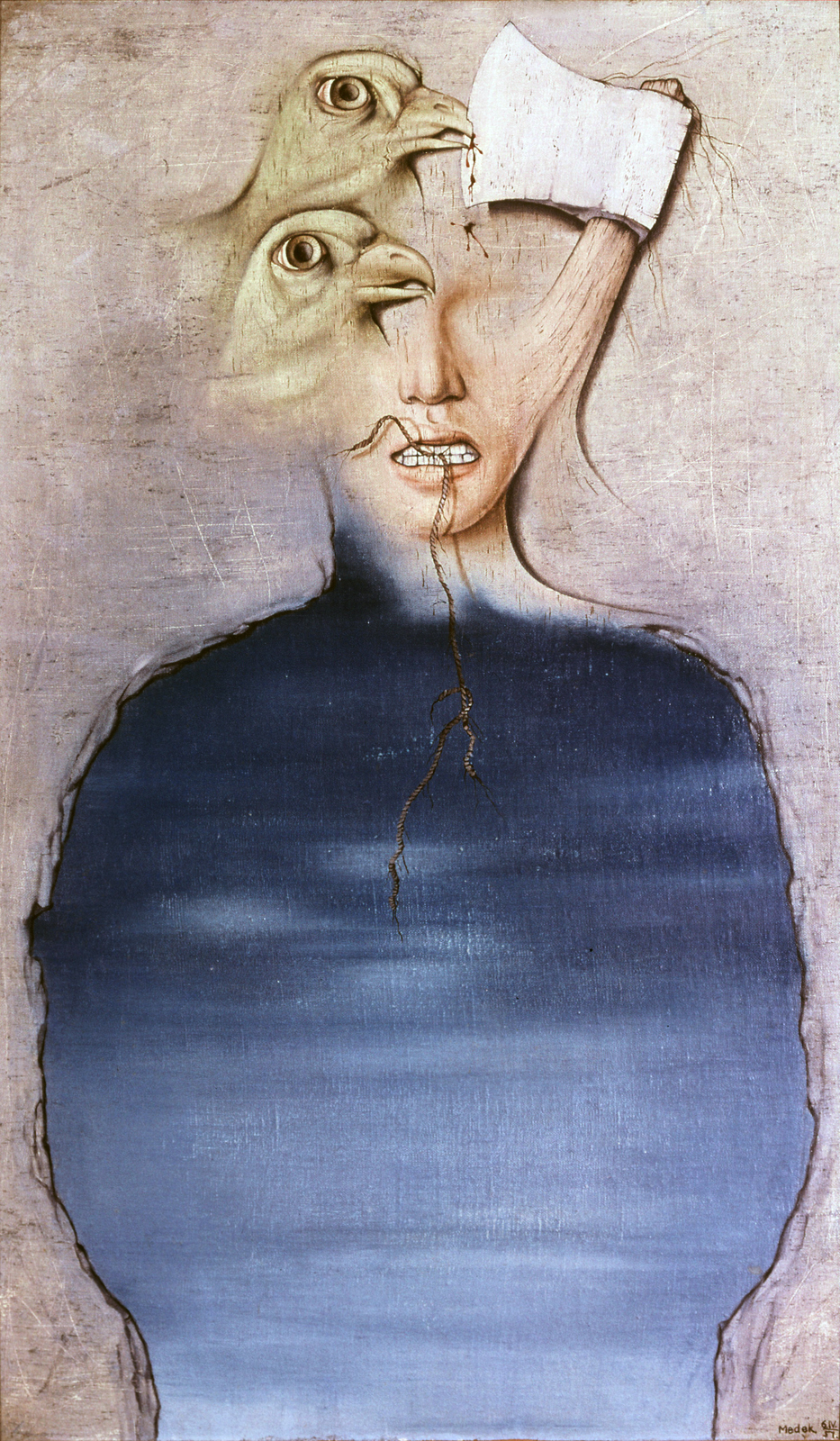
Mikuláš Medek, Swallower of Chains (1951)

=== Cycles Action, Food, Naked in Thorns, Games, transition to abstraction (1952–1959) ===
Medek shared a basic existential feeling with the poets of his generation Karel Hynek and Vratislav Effenberger, authors of the contemporary black novel To Live (1952), and like some of his classmates from the Academy of Arts and Crafts, he experienced a deep creative crisis in the early 1950s. In the first half of the 1950s, he suffered from a sense of impending disaster, depression, which he tried to suppress with alcohol and the psychopharmacum Psychoton (amphetamine). He suffered from insomnia and had difficulty concentrating. In his diaries he writes: the objective reality of these years is so programmatically mind-numbing that it makes any concentration and orientation in the world of poetry (painting) and the complexities of subjectivity impossible. If this is their program of how to act on the ideological superstructure, nothing can be said except that their work is succeeding (27 January 1954). In a January 1953 survey, he answered the question of how black humour arises by quoting the ubiquitous communist slogans of the time and summarized: all this is a manifestation of the spontaneous debility of the world, which precipitates in our consciousness into the sour sediment of black humour. Black humour is a reaction to deadly stupidity and the peaceful moronic optimism. Medek seeks a background in his family and studio environment, and concretises the internal model with a preparatory drawing. He moved from the imaginative paintings Swallower of Chains (1950) and Feast IV (1951), in which the outline of a human body from Medek's dream appears in which Emila walks through a wall, to a direct painting of a figure based on the model. The portraits of Zbyněk Sekal and Jaroslav Puchmertl (1952-1953) also date from the same period.

In his notebook he states: I think that the phenomenon of the existential feeling of the world is communicable in painting only perhaps by a figurative and concrete formulation of "objects", that is, primarily people. It is a world of absurd concreteness and thunderous materiality without philosophizing and psychologizing, wonderfully plain, simple, but in the intensity of existential feeling enchantingly magical. It requires an image stripped of all the schematic props inherent in artistic endeavours before the war. Hence the apparent non-avant-garde. Medek began to use a new painting technique - he painted the figures with oily egg tempera, the background with oil. The first model was Emila (Emila and Flies, 1952), and later Vratislav Effenberger's wife Anna Marie (The Head that Sleeps the Imperialist Sleep, 1953, Cranachesque Supralyric with an Imperialist Flower, 1953–1954). The ruthlessly seen female character presents in expressive scenes a drama of brutal animality, sadism, fear, ugliness, endless abandonment and horror (Žerekuře I / Chicken-guzzler I, 1952, destroyed, Hot Meal, 1953). Between 1951 and 1953, Medek was also visited by Anna Fárová, who translated texts from French for him and took turns as a model for some of the titles (Portrait 53, Hot Meal, 1953, Sensitive Action, 1954). The details of her figure, which Emila photographed for him at the time, became the basis for later works.

In one of the first paintings of this period, The Head that Sleeps Imperialist Sleep (1953), raw reality is brutally perverted into the opposite of socialist-realist optimistic kitsch - black kitsch. In the Action series, Medek created his figurative type, which was originally based on a real model. Its stylization and deformation have a firm order and do not appear exaggerated. The characteristic elongation of the arms and the recurring motif of the "needle in the mouth" trace back to a febrile seizure during which he experienced somatic depersonalization.. The basis of the figure is drawing, which he sculpts with colour and light in a single tone. The red figures are mostly set in an empty blue space indicated at first only by lines (Large Meal, 1954–1956). Sometimes a labyrinth with ladders is depicted below a low horizon (Cranachesque Supralyric with an Imperialist Flower, 1953–1954) or the space is opened up by a window and a view of a wall embedded with shards of glass (Scream, 1954). Colour takes on an emotionally symbolic function and is strongest in paintings made only of shades of blue (Action I (Egg), 1955–1956, Action II (Wool), 1956). The basic existential anxiety and psychological atmosphere of the 1950s is best described by the title of the series of paintings Naked in Thorns (1956-1958; the first painting in the series, which Medek later repainted, dates from 1954).

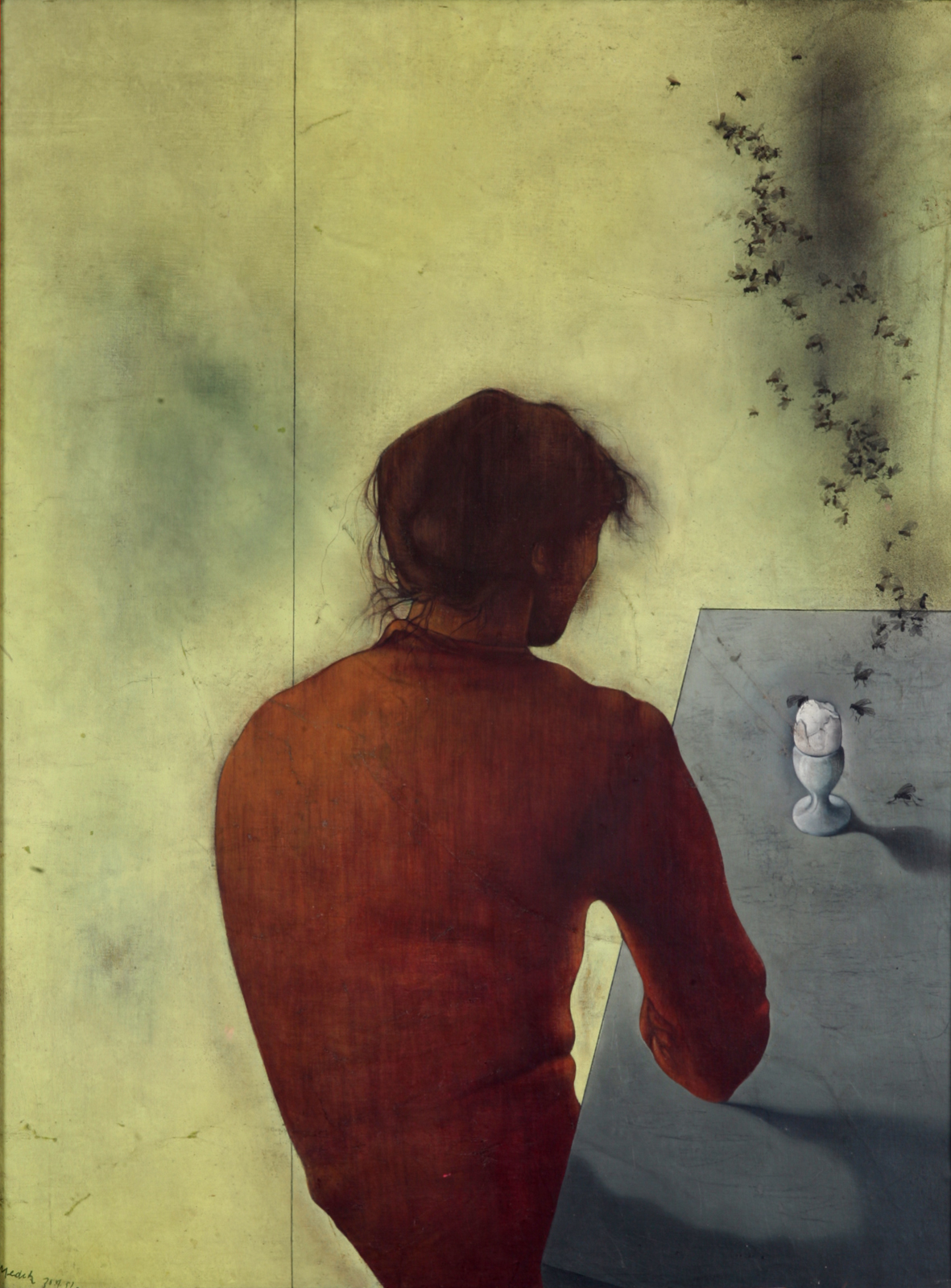
Mikuláš Medek, Imperialist Breakfast - Emila and Flies (1952)

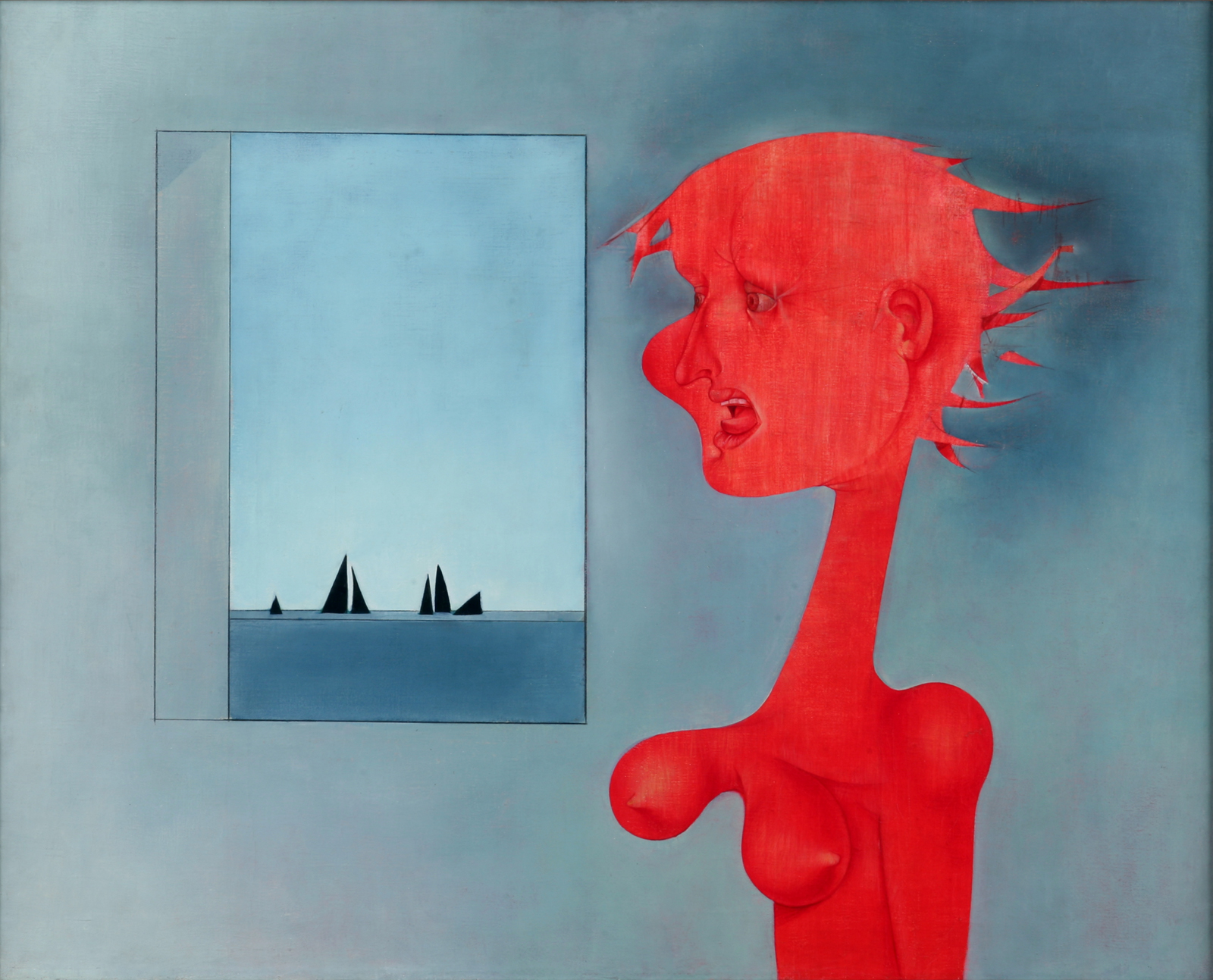
Mikuláš Medek, Scream (1954), Aleš South Bohemian Gallery in Hluboká nad Vltavou

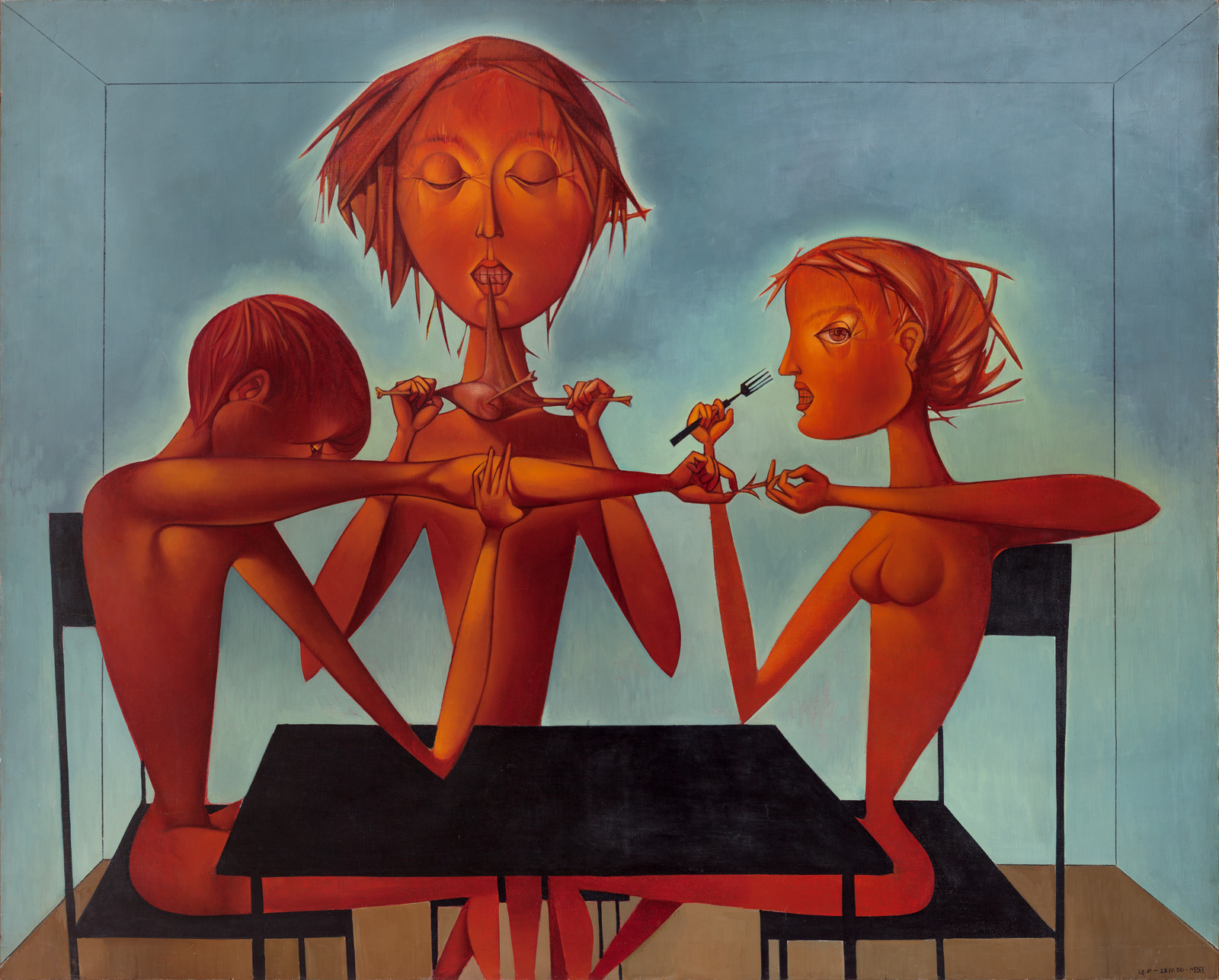
Mikuláš Medek, Large meal (1956), National Gallery Prague

The expressiveness of the paintings gradually disappears in the Games cycle, when their subject becomes a daughter (Games II - Children in the City, 1957). Medek smoothly continues to stylize the figure by depicting short hair in the form of stiff spikes and geometrically reducing heads and hands to squares and triangles. The picture plane gradually becomes the scene of minor events (The Child and the Tower, 1957, 22nd September in the Pouring Rain, 1958) and ceases to be monochrome. In Sleeping IV (1957), Medek used synthetic varnishes for the first time along with oil and then developed this technique throughout his subsequent work.

The Games series in the late 1950s resulted in the increasing stylization and decorativeness of the painting, the loss of thought tension and marked Medek's most significant artistic crisis (A Walk Through the City, 1957). The following transitional period, which can be inaccurately described as a transition to abstraction, is the most important for understanding Medek's work. The paintings Naked in the Thorns without the Thorns (1957), Playing the Piccolo (1957), Black Gambit (1958) and Blue Venus (1958–1959) stand at the boundary of the next phase of Medek's work. These illustrate the process of reducing the plastic form to a surface, omitting concrete signs (hands, hair) and creating new signs within a new pictorial order. The gradual process of sublimation of the figure continues with the paintings Hair in the Wind (1958–1959), Young Man on the Run (1959) and Red Venus (1959), where the pictorial plane itself becomes the carrier of meaning.

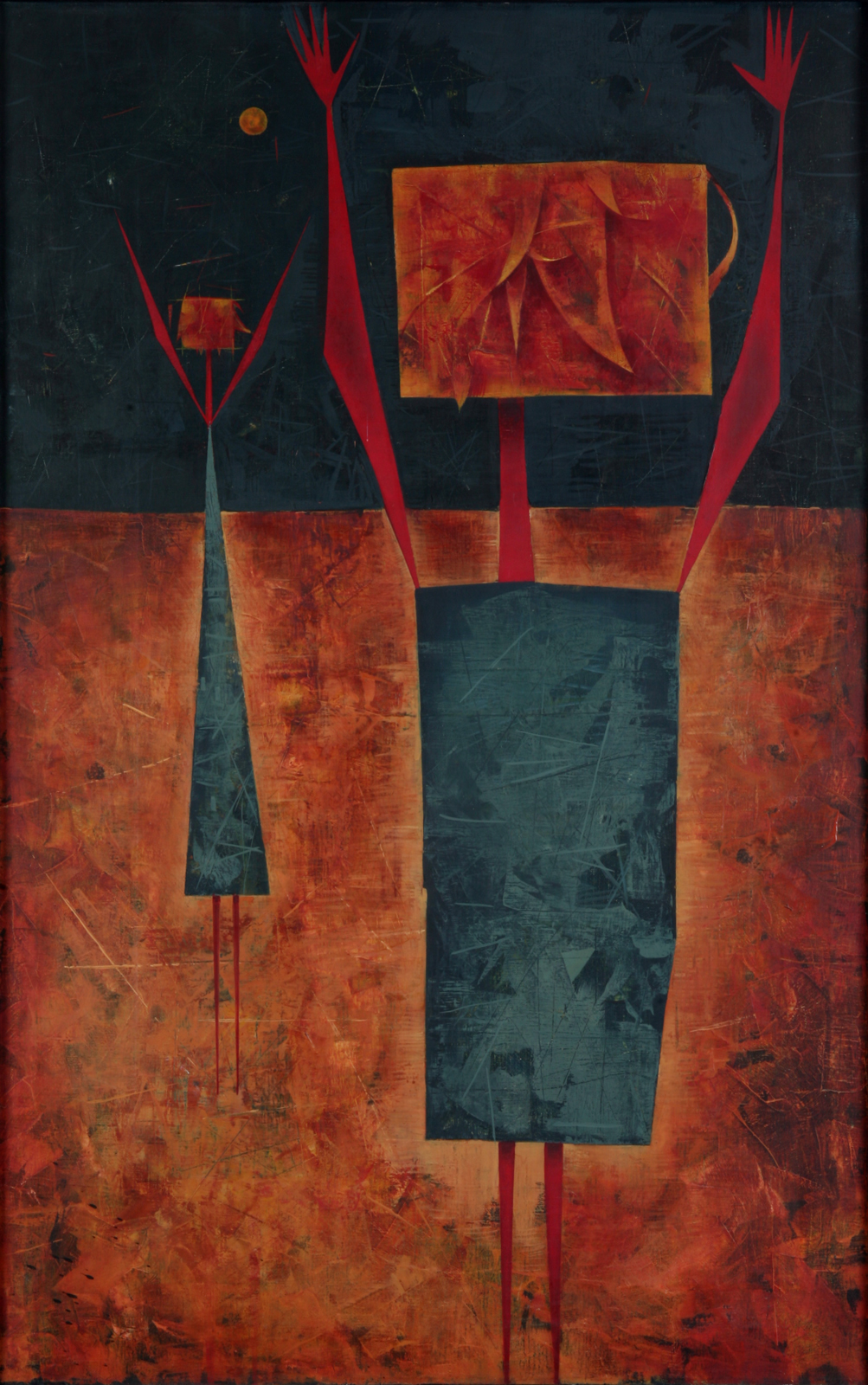
Mikuláš Medek, Games IV (1957)

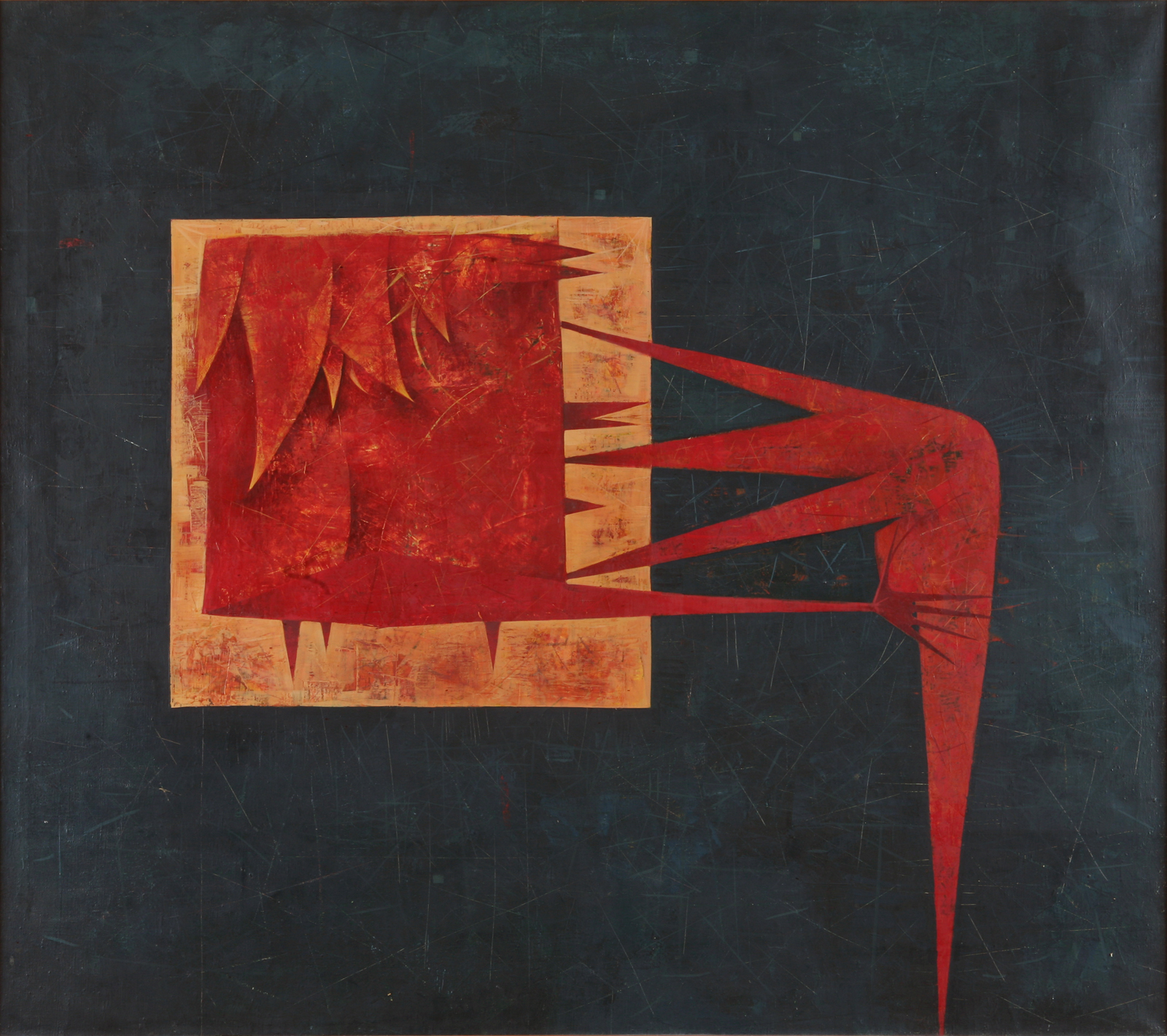
Mikuláš Medek, Sleeping IV (1957), Aleš South Bohemian Gallery in Hluboká nad Vltavou

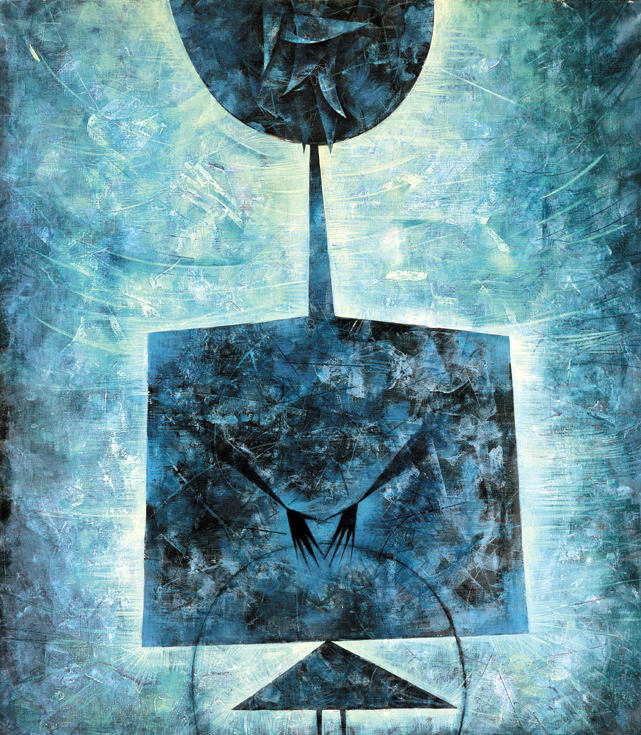
Mikuláš Medek, 12th September in a Strong Wind (1958), Gallery of Modern Art in Roudnice nad Labem

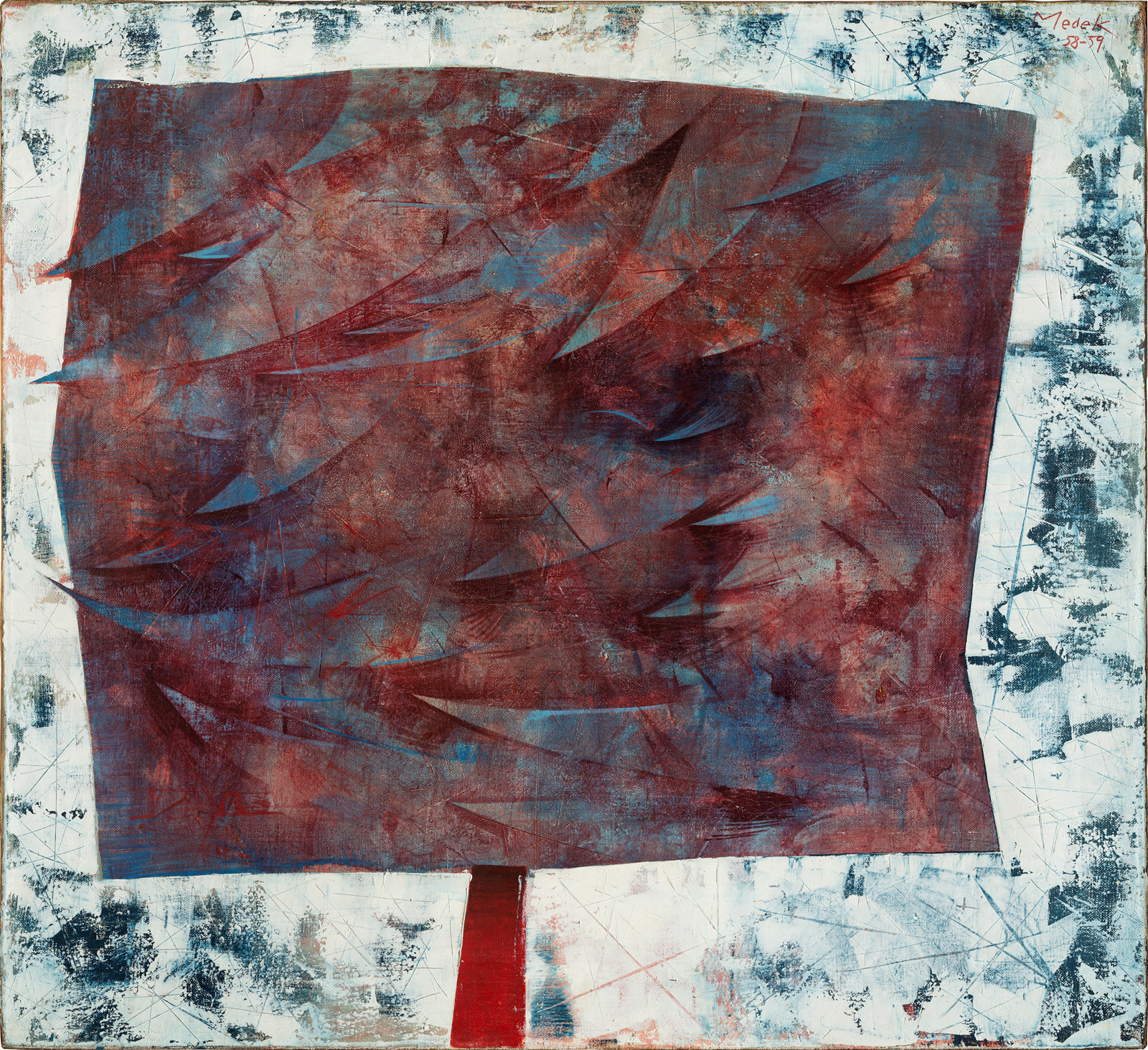
Mikuláš Medek, Hair in the Wind (1958–1959), National Gallery Prague

=== Prepared paintings (1960–1963) ===
The end of the 1950s marked the transformation of Medek's painting - the subject disappeared and the painting itself became the carrier of all meanings. The whole process had already occurred in the figurative paintings of the previous period, where, for example, in the series Naked in Thorns, internal situations are depicted as psychological micro-dramas. From these Medek moved on to the construction of an optically illustrative model of certain psychological situations that exist in a concrete form and have a concrete effect, but are not communicated by a simple depiction.

The series of Prepared Paintings represents a new artistic technique of structural painting and does not imply a complete abandonment of the human figure or the subject, but the figure was gradually stripped of all realistic detail. One of the earliest paintings from 1960 is Uncle Charles Romantic, others such as Two Coccyxes (1960), Meat of the Cross (1961), etc. Medek treats paint and painting matter as living tissue that is torn and injured with a knife and nail, and the violence done is visible and radiates outwards. Medek builds the paintings gradually from several layers, each of which is definitive in its way and contains meanings that may ultimately be obscured and visually inactive. The emotional impact of one layer, which is completely obscured at the outset, determines the emotionality or expression of the next layer and the next and the next, so that the psychic activity of all the layers is projected onto the top layer. The process of creating the "inner (subjective) model" is parallel to the work. There is far more intellectual activity involved than just the emotional and impulsive.

Medek himself describes this process as a direct imprint of reality without any distance - that is, "no longer a mirror, a testimony, etc., something as if from the other shore, but something that directly realises the great turmoil and anxiety, something that is directly within him (12 September 1958). The previously optically legible definition of the relation to the world, etc., is intensified into an optically independent element of the prepared image by the progression to non-figurative expression." Elsewhere, he likened his process to a film scene in Hamlet where the camera rides up on the back of L. Olivier's head sitting on the shore of the sea, passes over his head, and finally sees through his eyes.

The painting is a sensitive surface in which the processes and relations of his psyche are imprinted during the process by which the original idea is refined to its final realisation in the form of traces and impressions in the paint. The drama of movement leaves a trace in the form of a smooth surface, which acts as a bare and living wound amidst the drastic structure of the unfolded mass that forms its scab. The black surface in the painting may be the subject of the painting itself, while the membrane of the painting that surrounds it overlaps with the other nothingness and is the negative definition of this little black nothing. The identification of the painter with the mass of the painting is evidenced in the titles of some of the works, where the signifying surface is given a specific dimension (Place for 6,606 Romantic cm^{2}, 1962).

Medek's paintings act as a poetic act, a cry of anguish, a dramatic event and a human message, which, alongside imagination and the intricately encoded consciousness of culture and intuition beyond the threshold of personal experience, contains above all an immediately lived reality. This takes on the unique character of an irrevocable fatality that establishes the urgency of Medek's testimony. Initially non-poetic emotions are charged with high poetic potential during the realization, without losing anything of their brutal immediacy. Printed into the formed painting matter, they eventually become a kind of artistic reality and an emotional appeal of the aesthetic order. Bohumír Mráz finds in Medek's painting the heritage of Byzantium, which is manifested in the tendency towards a special form of monumentality, a sense of absolute space and, above all, a celebration of the luminous mass of oil painting. The resulting effect is dominated by the experience of beauty, harmony and perfection of the painter's rendering.

In the series Sudden Occurrences, Medek, with a slightly ironic distance, attributes an independent existence to the painting mass itself, which is the cause of minor catastrophes (Sudden Occurrence at the Border of 16,200 Pink cm^{2}, 1962–1963). The cycle of Sensitive Manifestations and Sensitive Signals responds to the situation of the individual in the modern city with its system of instructions, warnings and commands that act on the subconscious and force people to act automatically. The surface of the painting is dominated by small "plots" executed in engraved drawings, which will continue to dominate the subsequent stages of Medek's work.

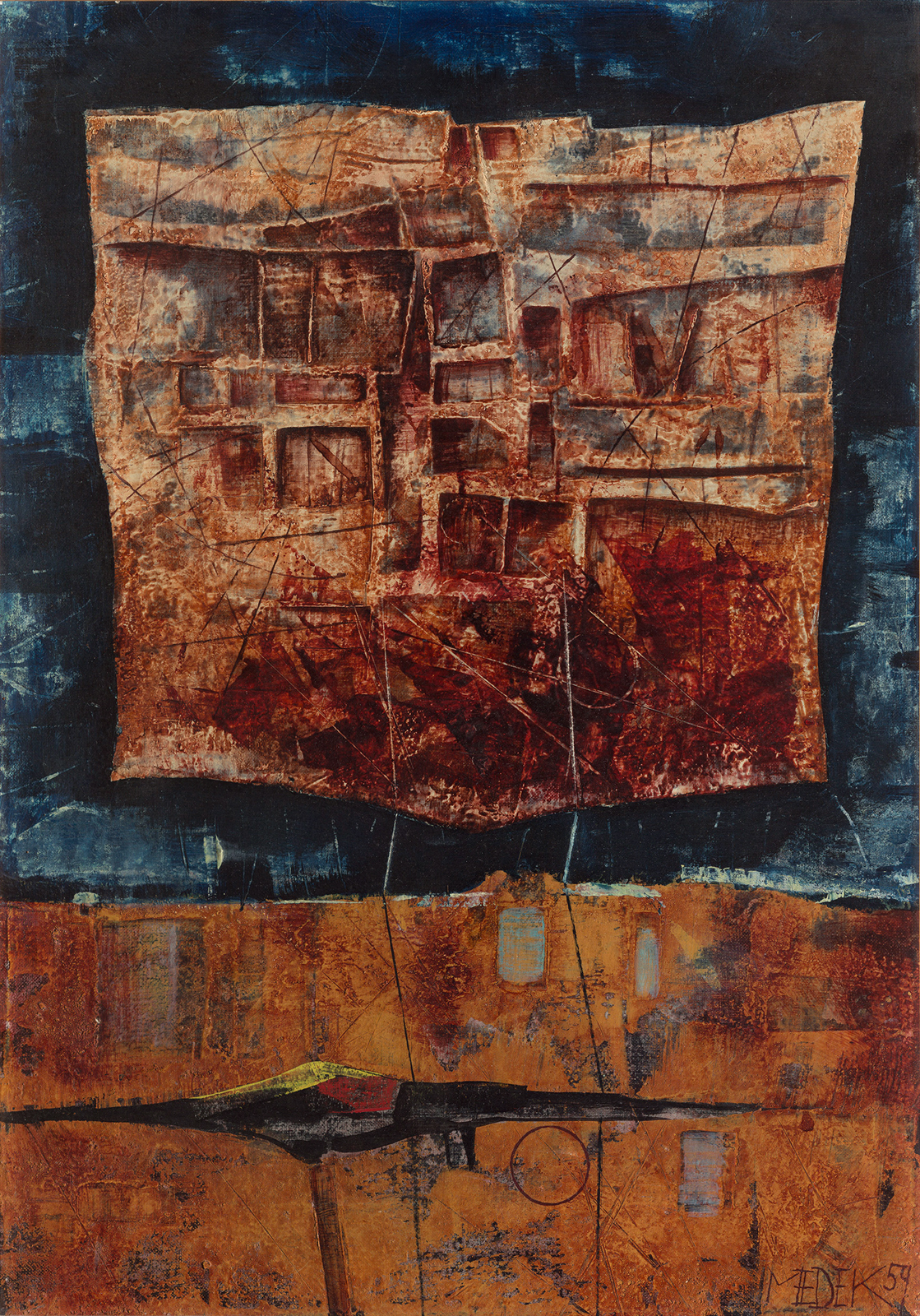
Mikuláš Medek, Young man on the run - Head (1959), National Gallery Prague

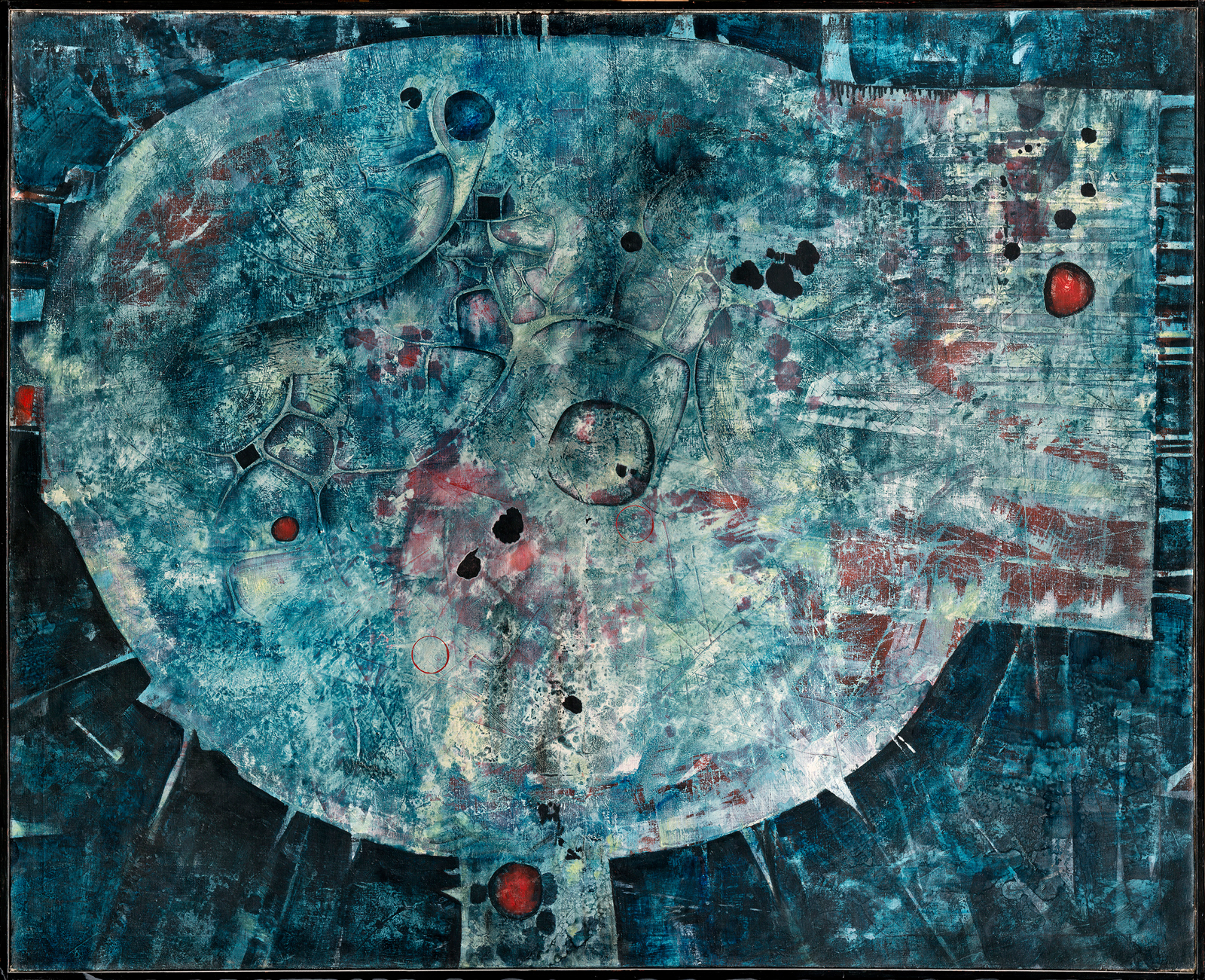
Mikuláš Medek, Big head full of little pranks (1960), National Gallery Prague

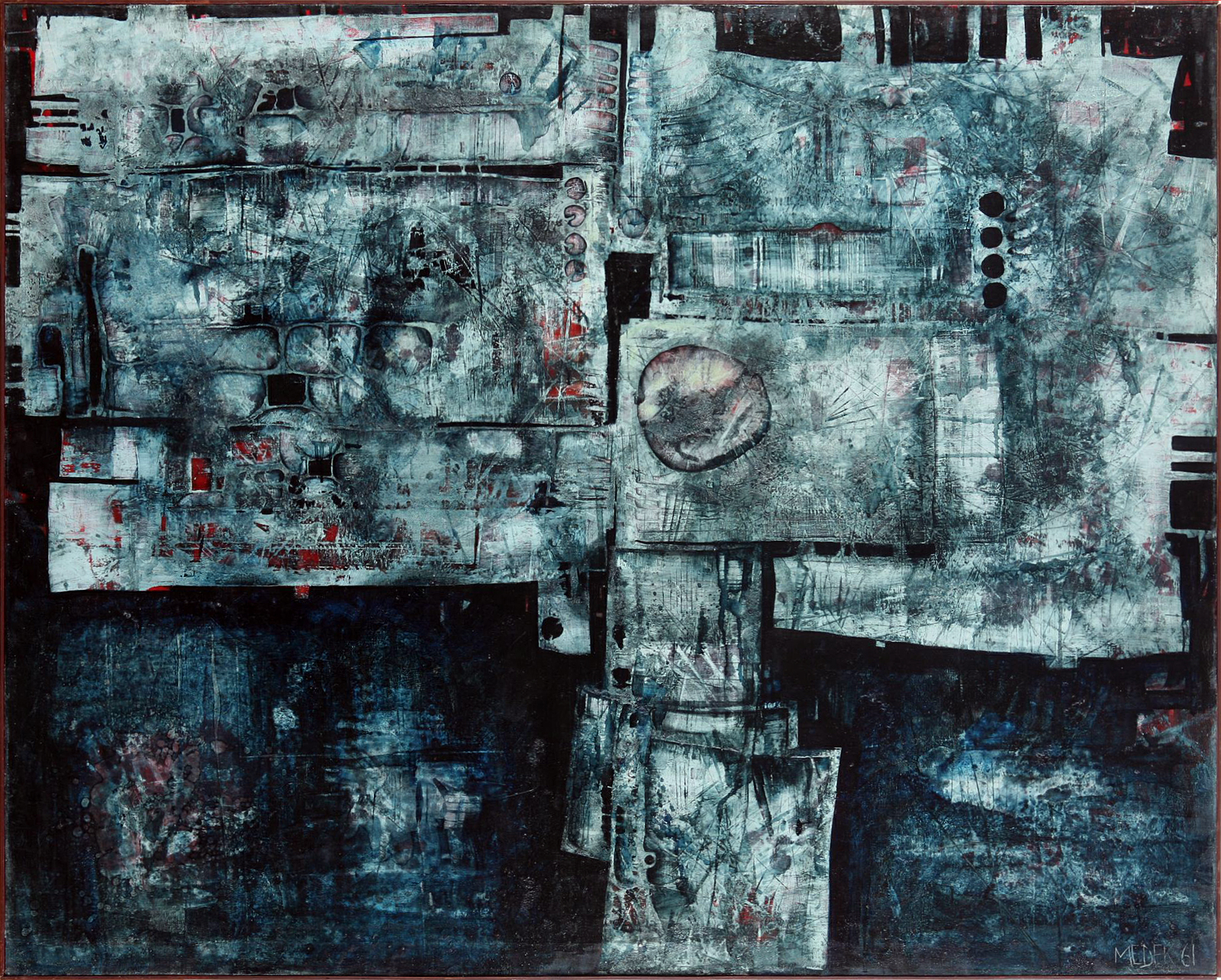
Mikuláš Medek, Cross of Iron I (1961), Aleš South Bohemian Gallery in Hluboká nad Vltavou

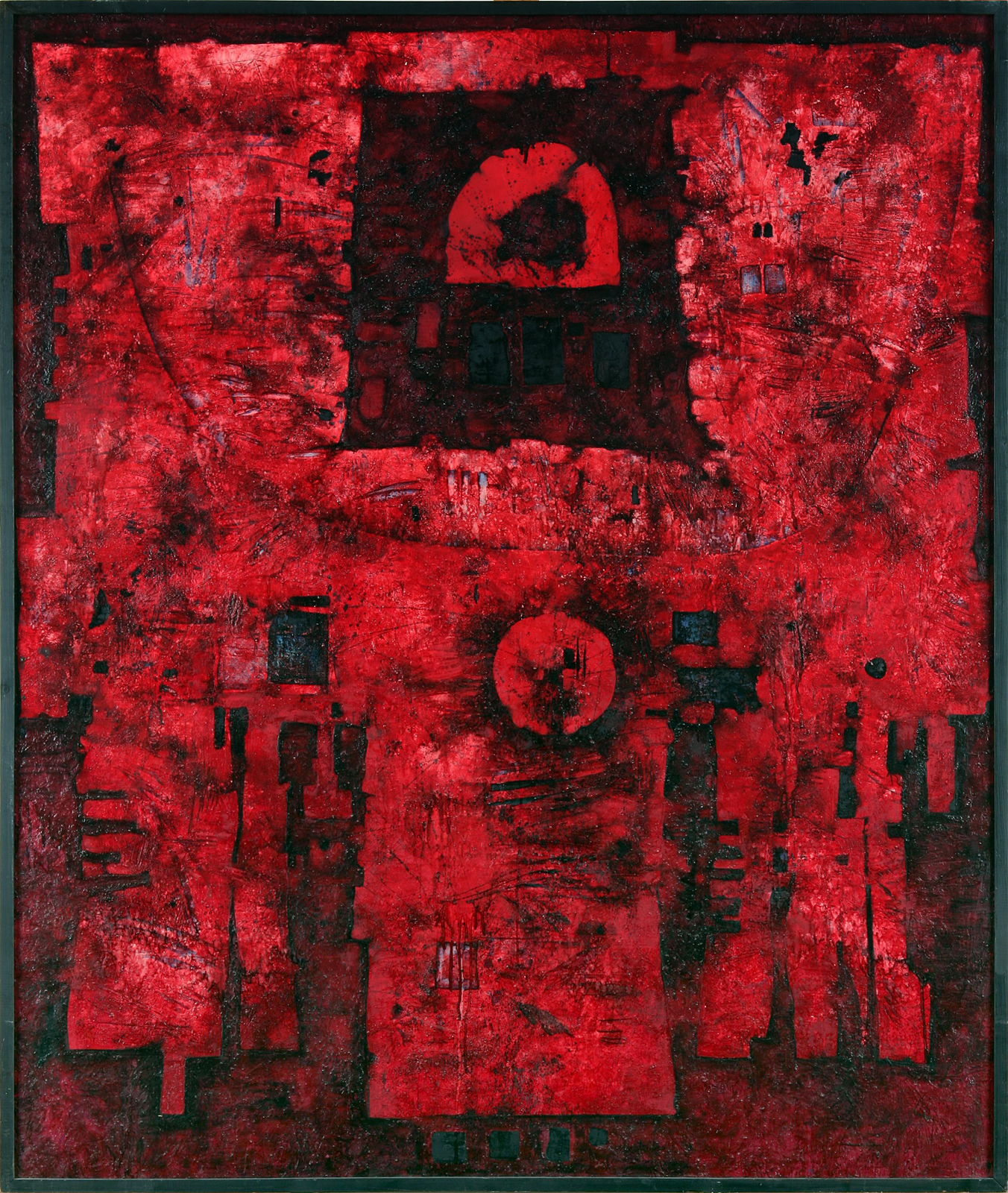
Mikuláš Medek, Celebration of 21 870 red centimetres (1962), Aleš South Bohemian Gallery in Hluboká nad Vltavou

=== 1964–1966 ===
Medek's personal situation changed dramatically when, after the democratic election of the new leadership of the Union of Czechoslovak Visual Artists in December 1964, he was accepted as a member and later as an alternate member of the Central Committee of the Union of Czechoslovak Visual Artists. Along with his rehabilitation, he became the subject of critical evaluation by art historians, some of whom considered Medek's painting to be a conservative relic in the mid-1960s. Medek reacted to the interpreters of his work from those closest to him, whom he came to believe were speaking too much into his art and life, with the ironic cycle Inquisitors.

Medek's fifth creative period transitions seamlessly from the Sensitive Signals series and represents a return to figuration against the backdrop of pictorial space while maintaining the technique of structural painting. He creates a new figurative typology for his large cycles of paintings, with geometrically stylized necks, limbs and heads, and with elements adopted from earlier periods - for example, hair or hands in the form of long curved spines (or the earlier predator's beaks), the venomous teeth from the painting Smoking Feast I (1950). The characteristic rectangular shape of the head with dark openings instead of eyes is established by the painting Death for 21,870 Fragile Blue Centimeters (1964), while in The Pity of the Fourth Inquisitor (1965) the closed eyes are marked by long eyelashes.

Many of the paintings reflect problems with alcohol (Too Much Alcohol, 1965, Too Deep Sleep II, 1965) or are self-portraits of the painter (Portrait of a Saint, 1966, The Saint Naked in Thorns, 1966) who had to give up alcohol because of his diabetes ("The Saint, It's Actually Me Now That I Can't Drink", Mikuláš Medek, 1966). An important milestone was the move to a new studio (1 May 1966), which the Union assigned to him after Jan Čumpelík. Medek initially felt uncomfortable there, and his sensitivity to the elements of reality seen from the window manifested itself in his paintings by changing the colouring and as small models of machines in engravings scratched into the coloured matter. Medek again began to make painterly sketches, testing the viability of his new method on a narrowly defined area of one subject (Glass Full of Unrest I-V, 1966). In the series Guests without a Host, he paints portraits of things that symbolically represent a particular person (The Monster Who Wants to Live Lovingly, 1965 - V. Effenberger).

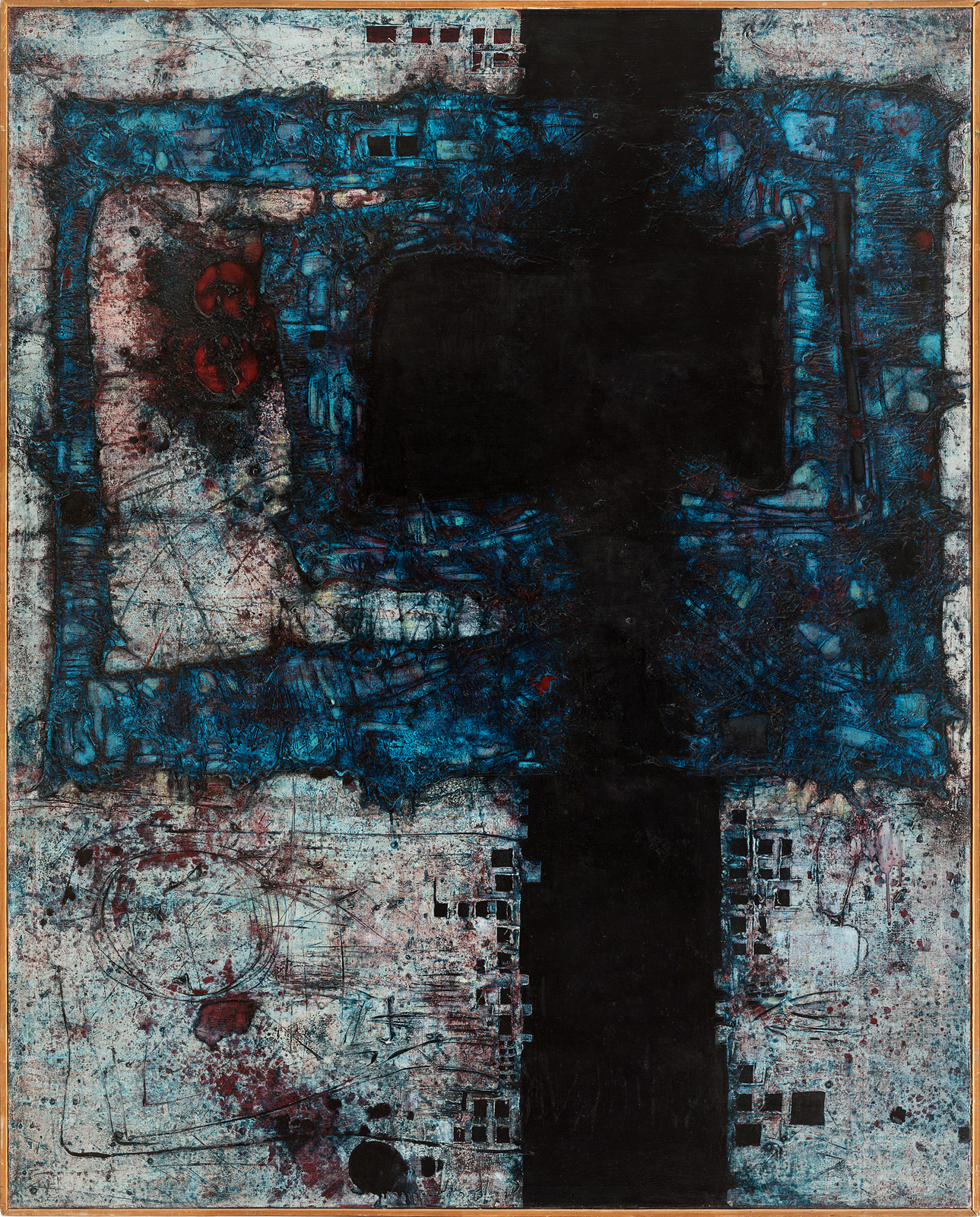
Mikuláš Medek, Sensitive manifestation II (1963), National Gallery Prague

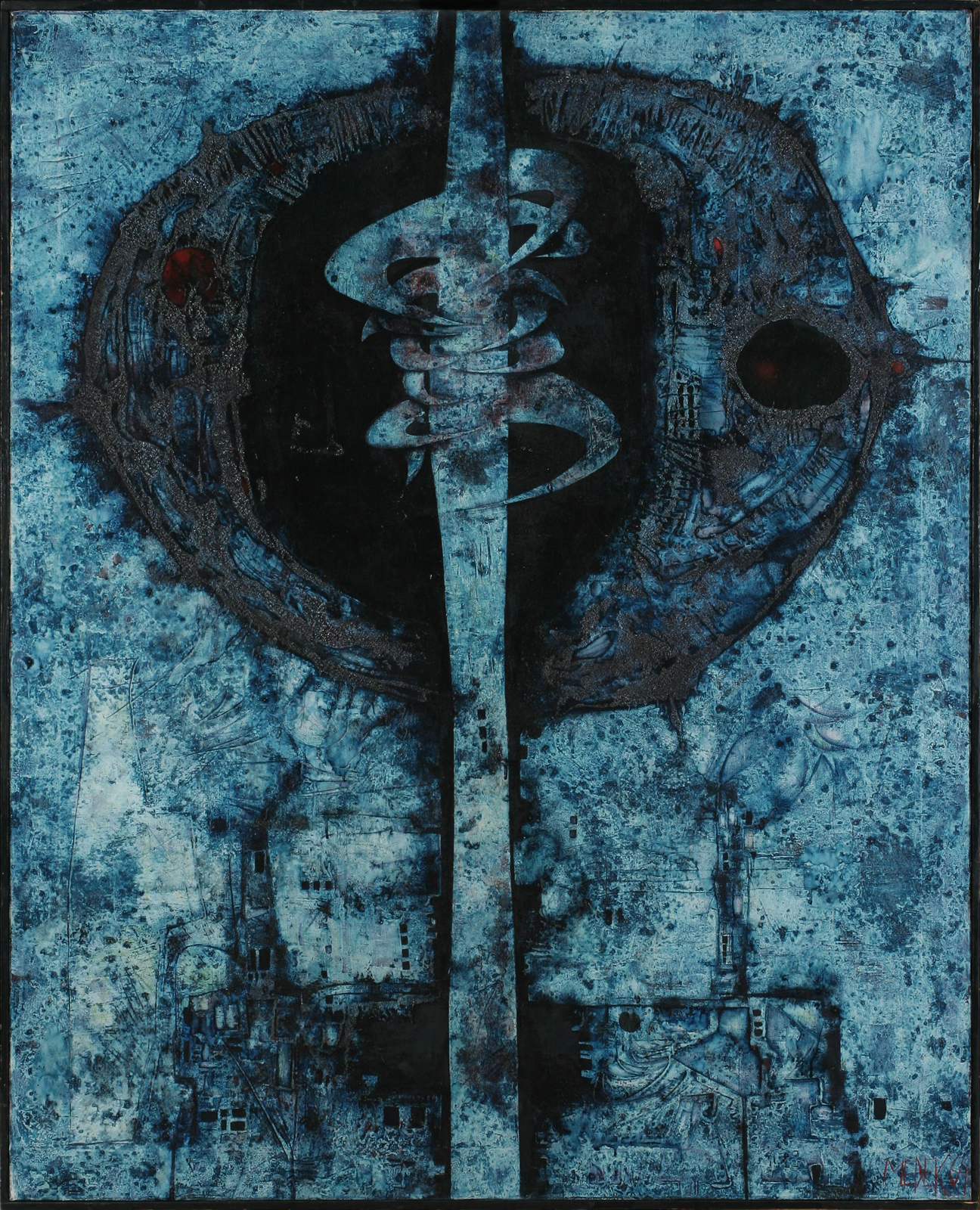
Mikuláš Medek, 162 cm of fragility I (1964), Regional Gallery of Fine Arts in Zlín

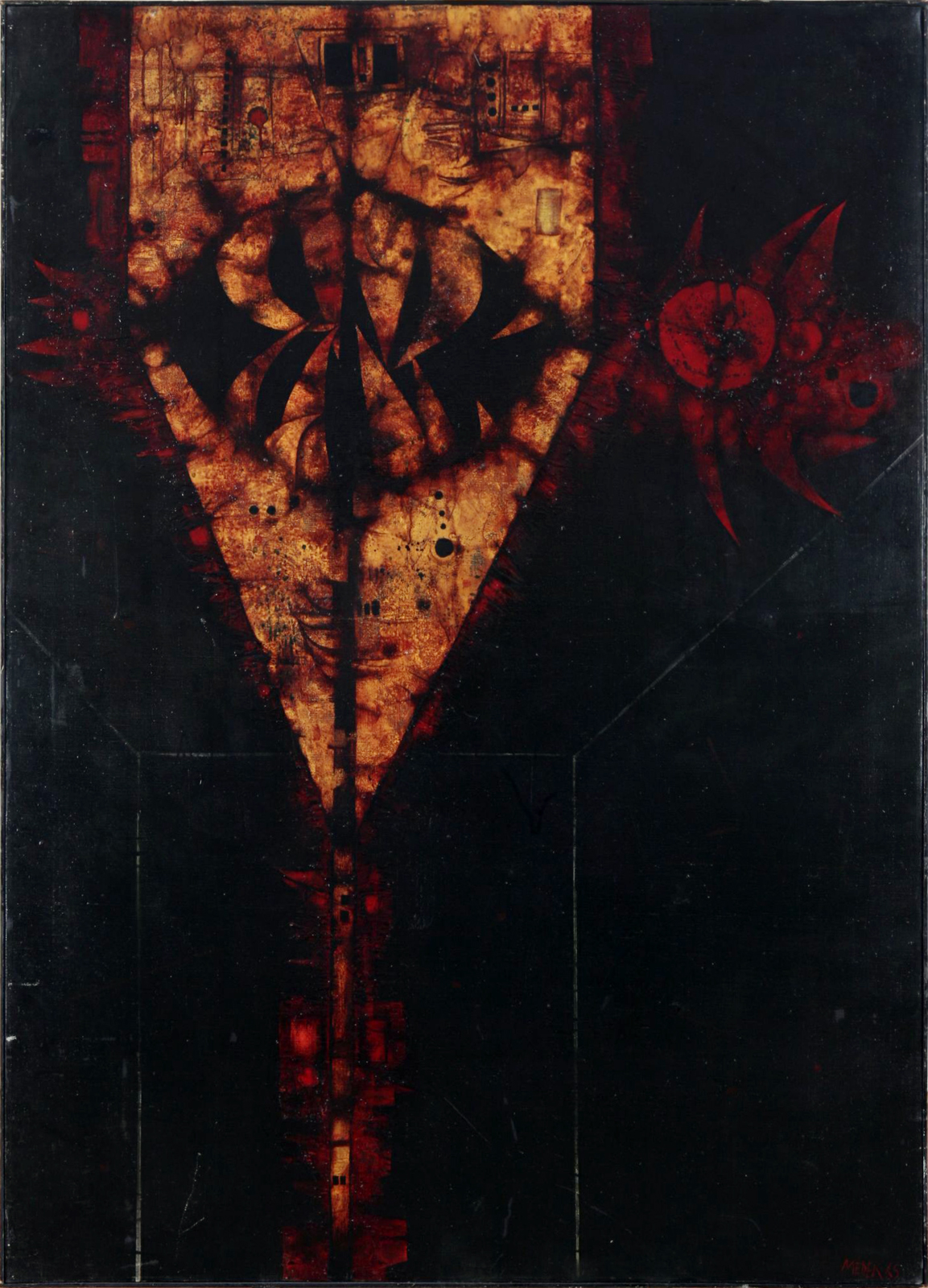
Mikuláš Medek, Woe IV. of an Inquisitor II (1965), Aleš South Bohemian Gallery in Hluboká nad Vltavou

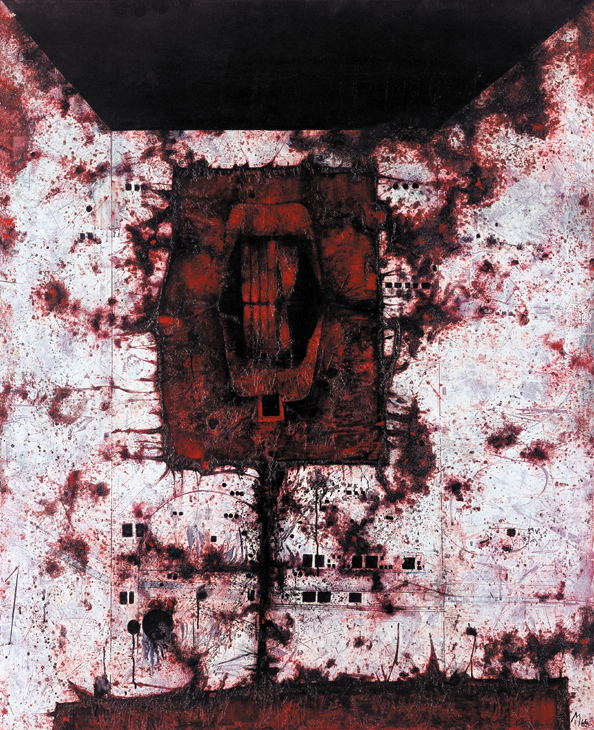
Mikuláš Medek, I go pale in January (1965), Moravian Gallery in Brno

=== 1967–1969 ===
The titles of Medek's paintings from the second half of the 1960s, in which figuration predominates, reflect a new relationship to the subject and the creative process, which expresses distance and self-irony. This led to the creation of the entire series of Portrayals of a View of .. (Annunciation, The Hungry Saint, Man in Tension). Some of the paintings refer to older themes (Miraculous Mother III, 1967, Blue Cry, 1967, Sudden Incident on the Border of Yellow III, 1967), but are treated in a new form. Small mechanisms in the form of wheels, gears, beak-like folds and levers appear for the first time in the paintings made during his stay in Genoa. In 1967, the so-called Madrid sketchbooks of Leonardo da Vinci were discovered with a number of technical drawings. Medek, who had been interested in Leonardo since his student days, when he discovered Fred Bérence's book, Lionardo da Vinci, Worker of Reason (1939), suggested an erotic or sadomasochistic meaning to his machines. In the painting Depiction of the View of a Man in Tension (1967), he interprets them as mutually devouring bird heads attached to a common axis. The painting with a technical subject was also inspired by a newspaper photograph of the aircraft carrier Enterprise (Mr. Enterprise, 1968).

The technical motifs in Medek's paintings may also be related to the alienation he felt towards technical civilization. After his return from his first trips to the West, he states quite openly that he prefers the poverty of the East, close to the Franciscan principle, and the idea of the spiritual man as the bearer of culture ("No one will take our socialism from our souls, because we are sell-outs"). He was undoubtedly influenced by the revolutionary ideas of Mao Zedong, whose Red Book, with selected quotations, became popular among leftist idealists and was available at the Chinese embassy in Prague in the late 1960s.

Image Attempted portrait of J. Ch. (1967) recalls a situation in which art critic Jindřich Chalupecký was wrapped in a roll of wrapping paper as part of a happening. The same motif foreshadows the entire series The Tower Designers, in which Medek throws in a number of ironic meanings and demonstrates a critical distance from technical civilisation. The paintings are above all an intellectual construction in which contour, drawing and shape are emphasized, while the structure of the painting recedes into the background. The whole theme may also be related to the commission for the decoration of the new airport building in Ruzyně, which was preceded by frequent meetings and consultations with architects. The motif is renewed in a number of variations, and sometimes the top of the tower extends beyond the surface of the painting as a symbol of transcendence (Tower Designer's Table, 1968). The last paintings of the entire series from 1969: Head of the Tower Designer, The Cry of the Tower Designer, and The Desk of the Pink Tower Lover return to earlier motifs from the painting Scream (1954), The Grim Reaper (1964), and Banquet I (1950). Paintings dedicated to Hieronymus Bosch, the Marquis de Sade or Wernher von Braun are also related to this cycle. In 1968, Medek created a painting that stands out from the other cycles and was probably a reaction to the Warsaw Pact invasion of Czechoslovakia in August 1968 – Stones In the Mouth, a Bump in the Head (first published in Listy, 14 November 1968).

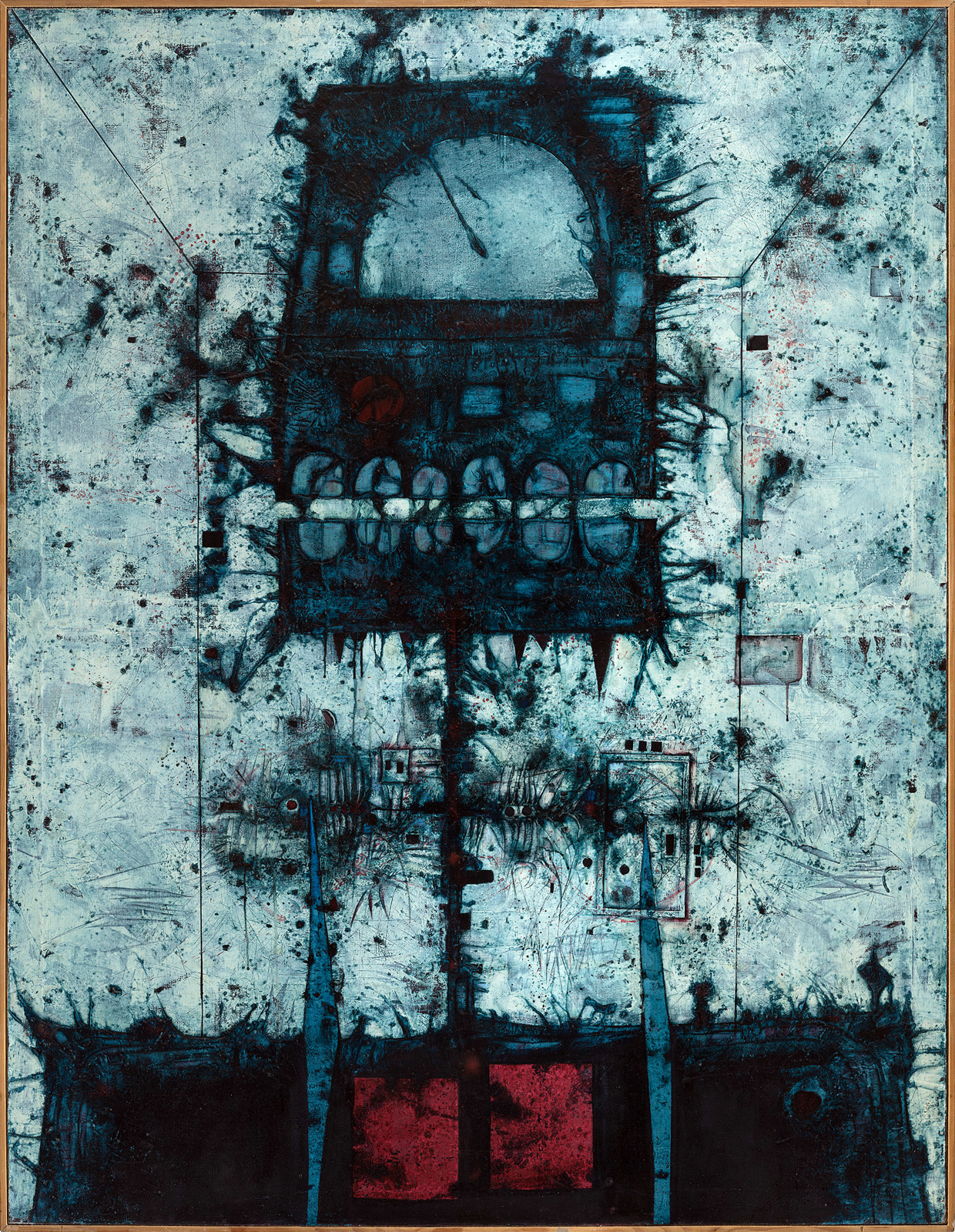
Mikuláš Medek, Portrayal of a View of a Hungry Saint I (1966), National Gallery Prague

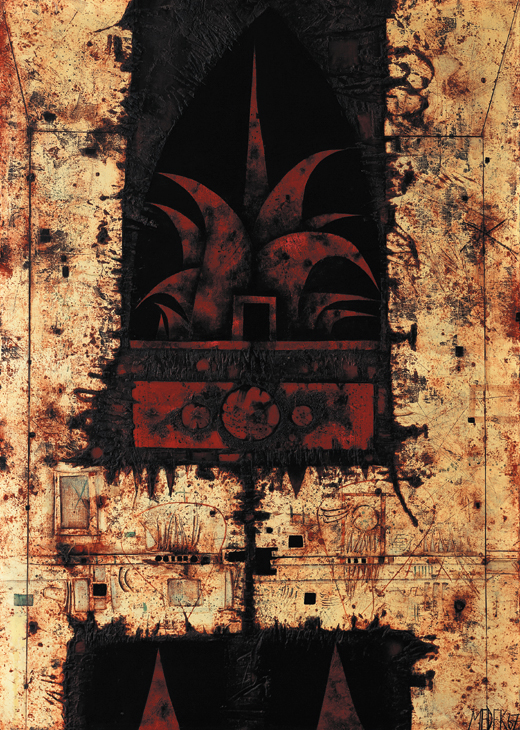
Mikuláš Medek, Red Saint (1967), Museum of Art Olomouc

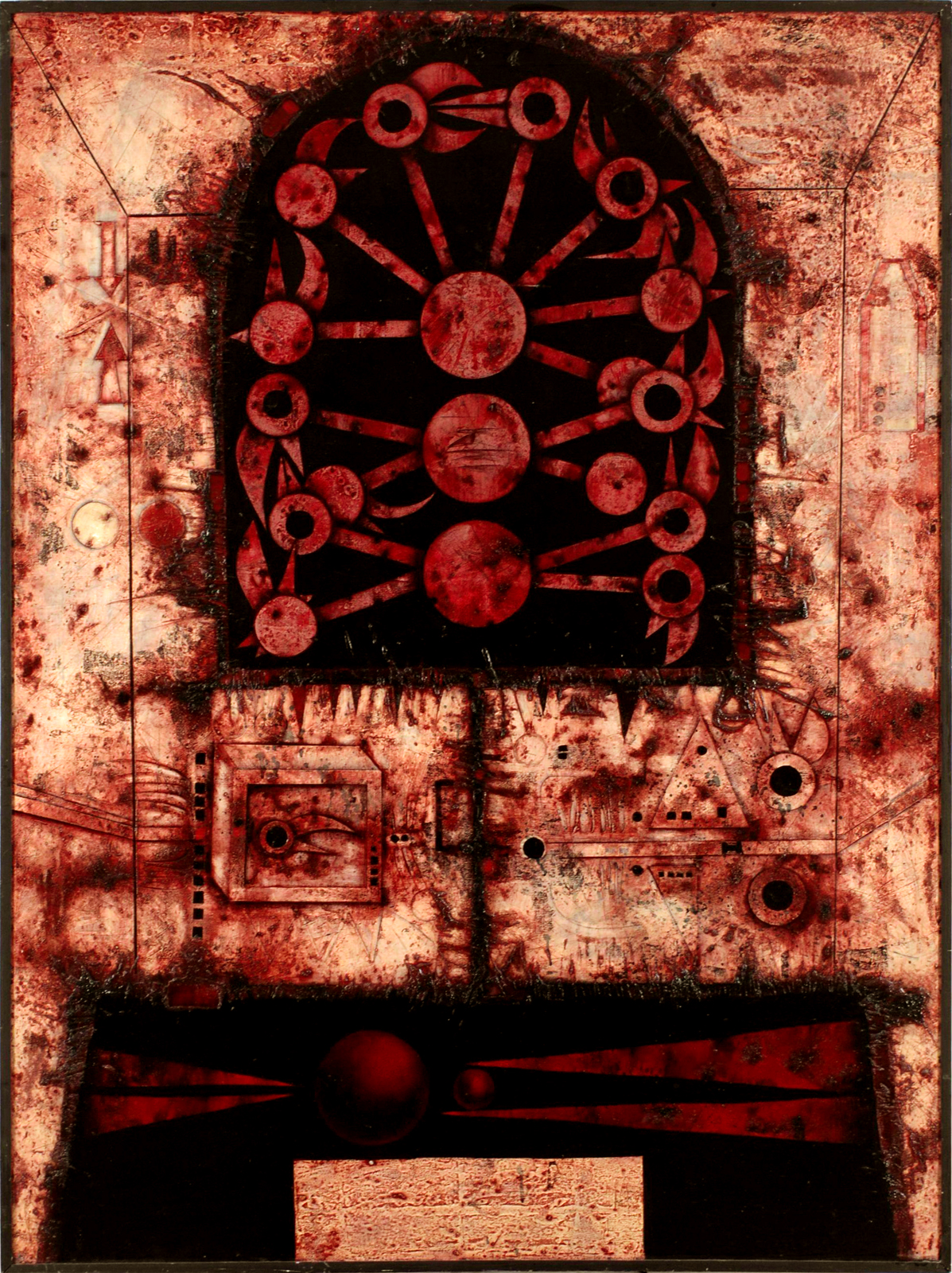
Mikuláš Medek, Portrayal of a View of Man in Tension (1967), East Bohemian Gallery Pardubice

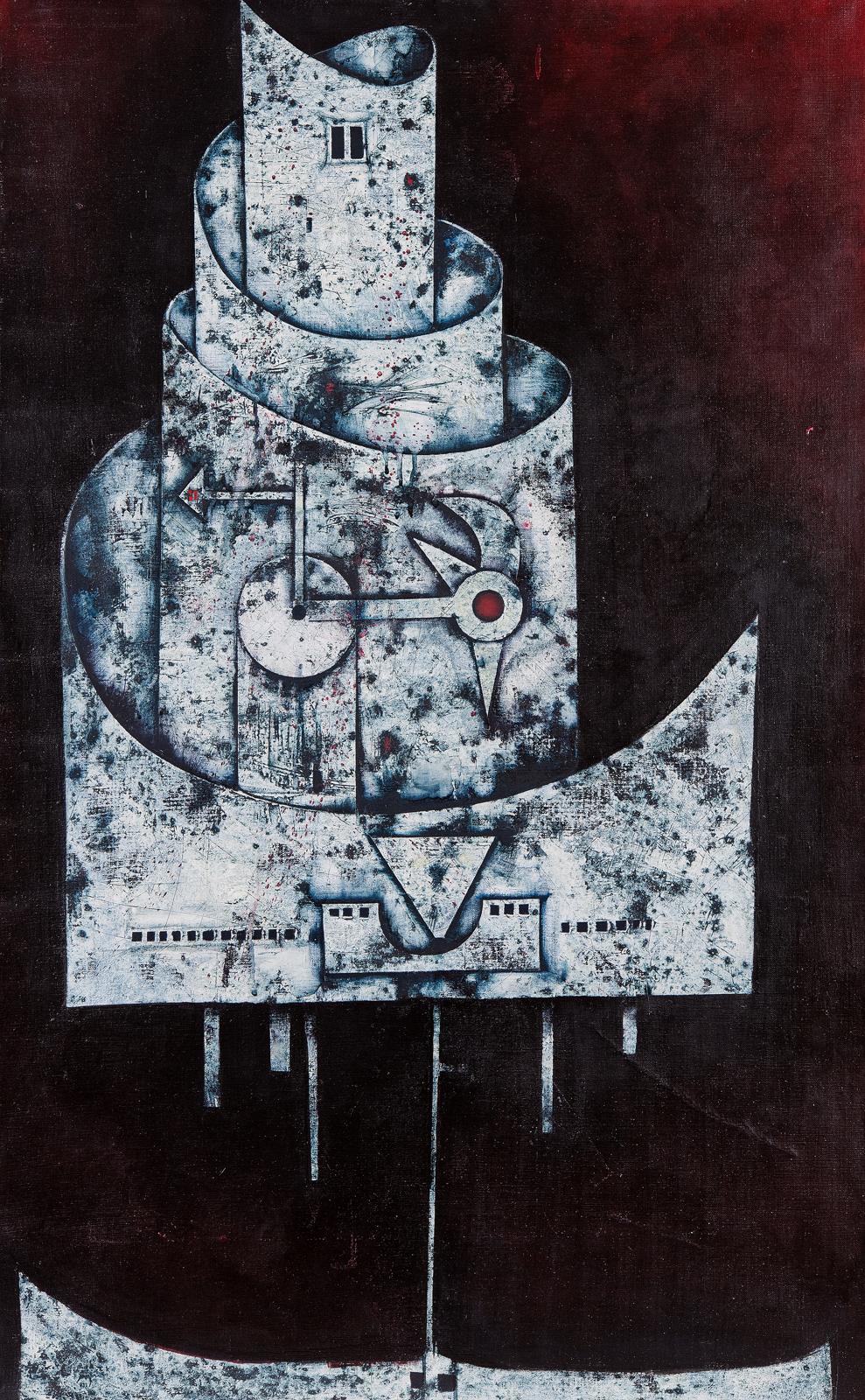
Mikuláš Medek, Attempt at a portrait of J. Ch. (1967), Prague City Gallery

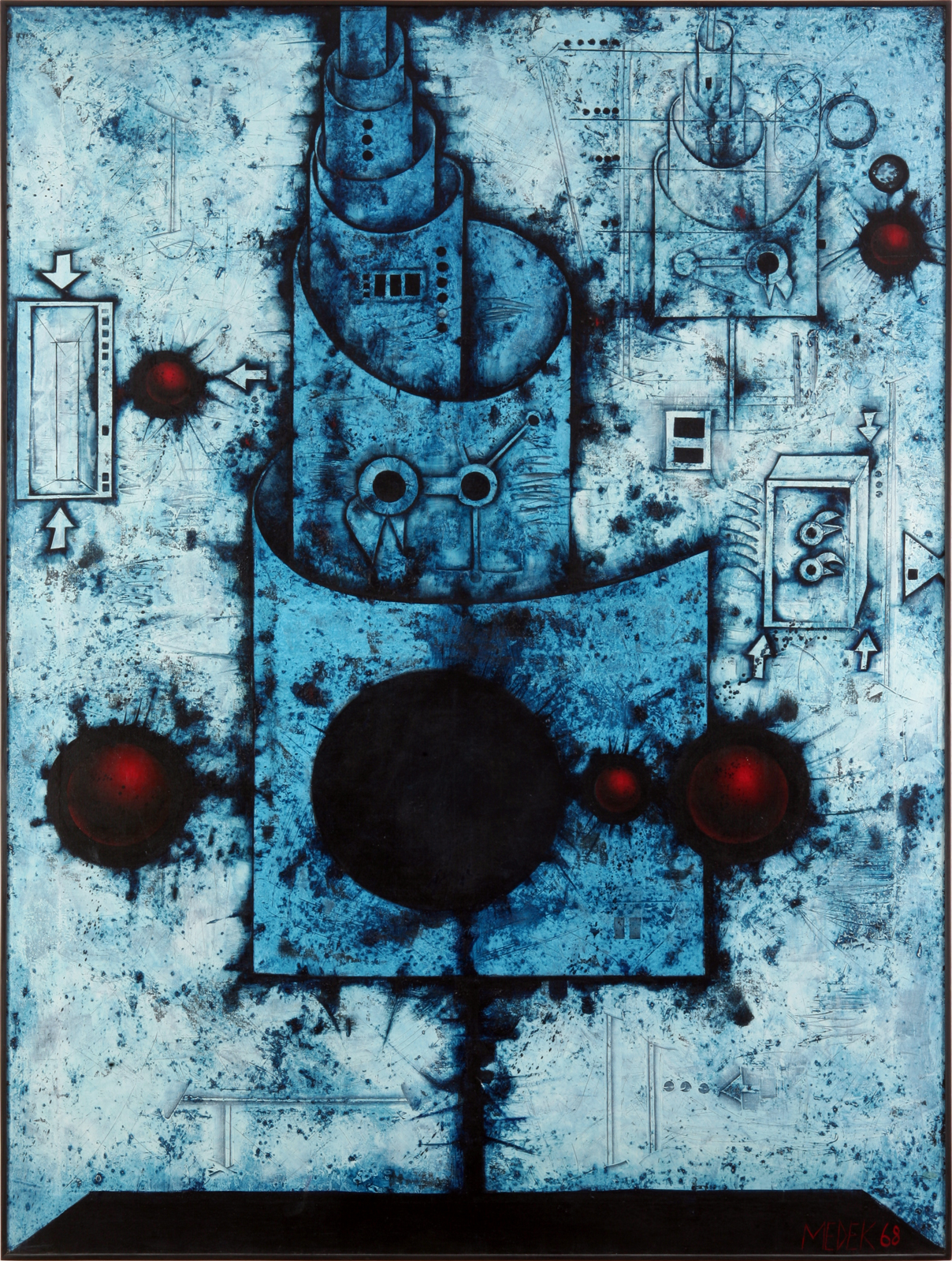
Mikuláš Medek, Tower Planner's Table I (1968)

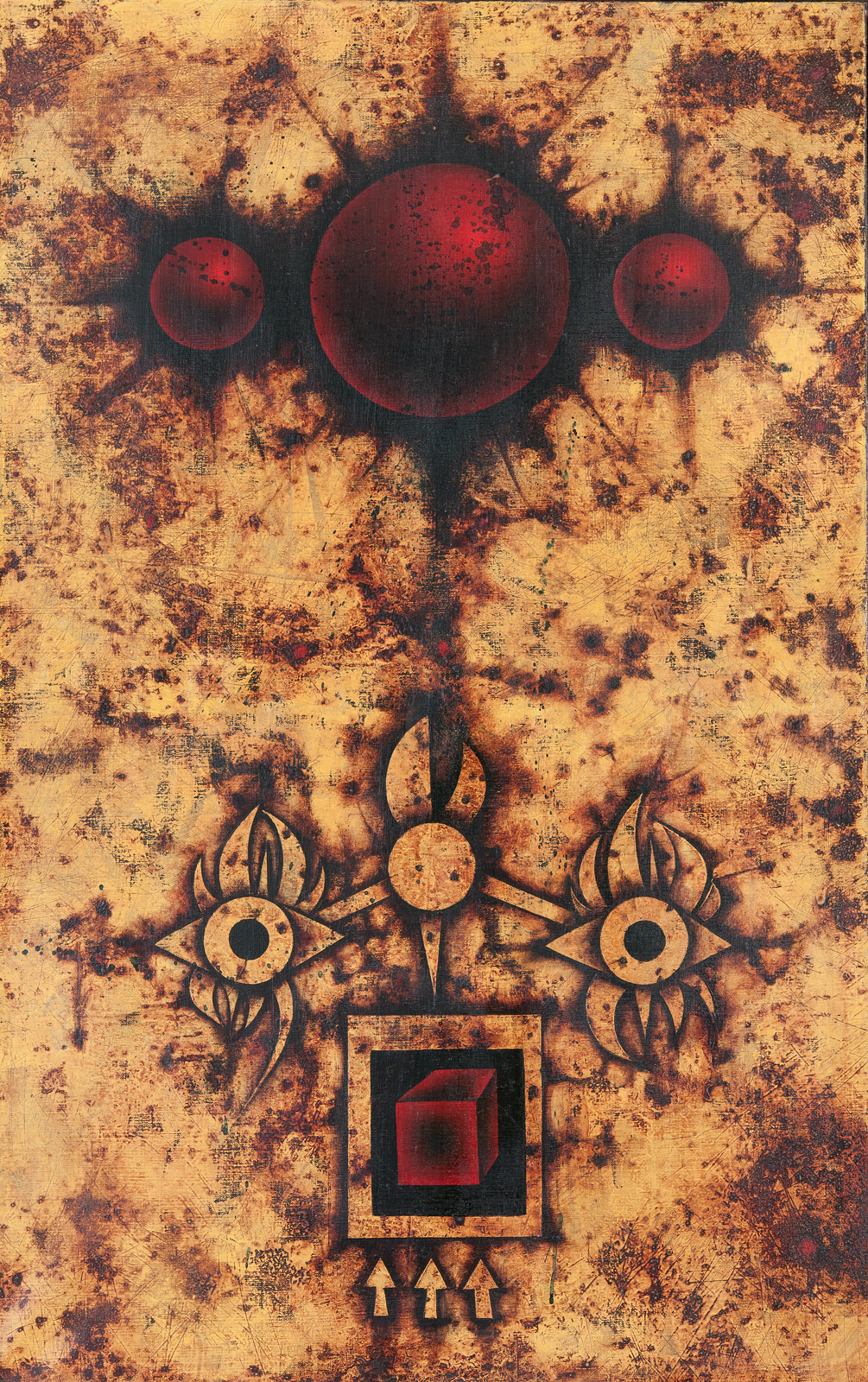
Mikuláš Medek, Stones in the Mouth, a Bump in the Head (1968), Prague City Gallery

=== 1969–1974 ===
The vindictiveness of the cultural normalizers was cruel to Medek, and his exclusion from society after 1970 was not much different from the 1950s. Moreover, Medek was plagued by his illness and devoted all his remaining energy to painting. He returned to some of his subjects well into the 1950s and completely reworked them formally (Golden Scream III, 1969, Miraculous Mother V, 1970). At the same time, his paintings from the 1970s include quotations of motifs from his previous work as well as returns to the biomorphic inspirations of his early years as a painter. In the painting Ivishka II (1970) and several paintings from the angel series (Head of the Thirsty Angel II, 1970, Thirsty Angel II, 1970), the structures of the heads resemble a cross-section of a plant tissue. The book on the medieval religious movement was the basis for the cycle of expressive paintings The Beguines I-III (1970) and the painting The Lamp of the Frenzied Nun.

In 1970, Medek created an altarpiece for the chapel in Kotvrdovice, which was preceded by several studies with geometric solids executed with illusory plastic painting. The 1970s also marked an extraordinary creative upsurge in his illness-ridden life. Medek's personal martyrdom is depicted by the screaming head in the painting The Grim Abstainer (1970), or by the instruments of Christ's Passion from the altar of Kotvrdovice used again in the painting The Hollow Head (1970). The theme of death and suffering recurs in various variations in all his works after 1970.

For a pair of paintings, Shooting Range (1973), he borrowed the title from Toyen, who made a set of twelve drawings on this theme between 1939 and 1940. He treated the arrival of the Angel of Death in his extensive series Angels of the Painful Window (1970), Thirsty Angels (1970-1973), Angels of the Evil Birds, and Dancing Angels of the Black Grim Reaper. A pair of (Veronica's) Veils (1971-1972) date from the same period. Medek's work concludes with the Moving Graves series, where obelisks from his early drawings for Evelyn Waugh's short novel The Loved One (1948) and motifs from his painting Shooting Range (1973) reappear, this time in red against a backdrop of black nothingness. The deceptive perspective of the building blocks - curbs, slabs, threshold guards - decompose and sovereignly confuse the space of agony. The paintings are constructed from elements whose secrets only the painter himself knew, and according to Linhartová, take a form that recalls the womb as a symbol of the renewing power of the universe (Moving Grave II, like a toddler, 1973). Medek's work concludes with the small painting Four Circles (1974).

Mikuláš Medek was one of the most consistently sanctioned painters, if not the most persecuted, by various bans and restrictions until the mid-1960s and, after a brief loosening, again from the 1970s onwards. His life and his paintings come across as a scream. It is a succession of intoxications and deadly falls. It is a kaleidoscope of human suffering, artistic doubts, mental anguish, physical pain. Mikuláš Medek is an exceptional personality of Czechoslovak art scene. His work is astonishing, inimitable, hardly redeemed.

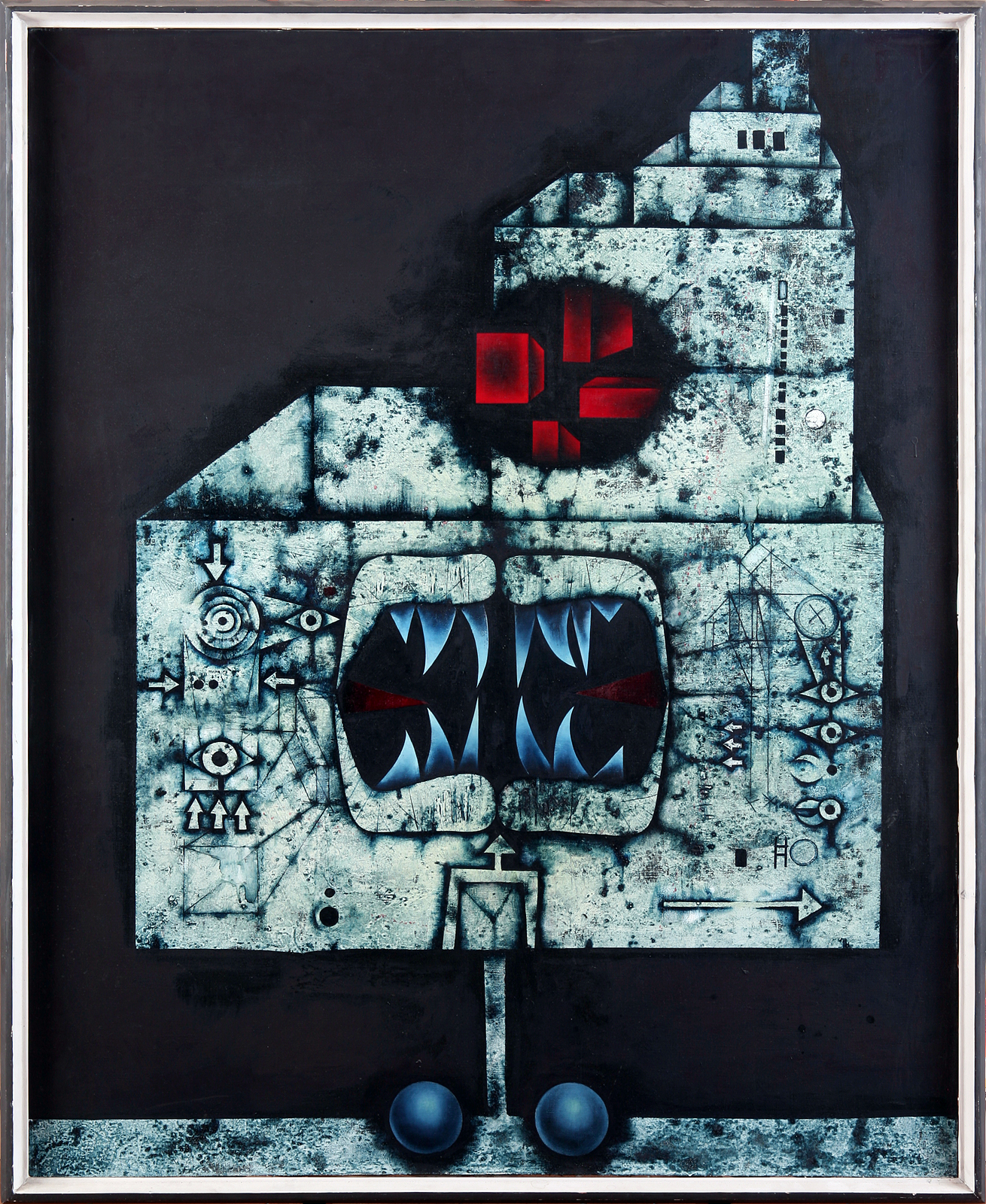
Mikuláš Medek, Attempt at a Portrait of the Marquis de Sade II (1969), Gallery of Modern Art in Hradec Králové

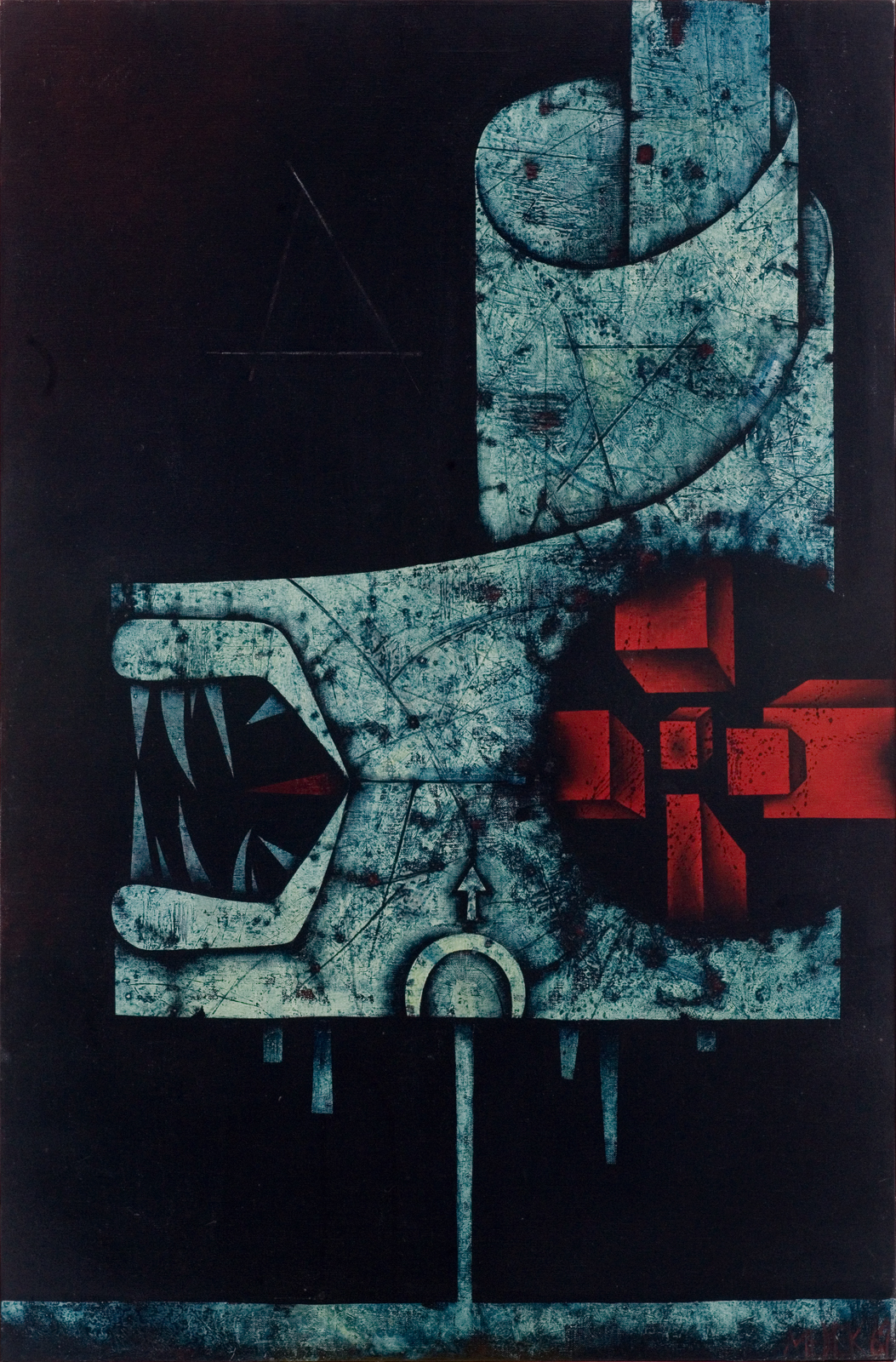
Mikuláš Medek, Head of tower designer X (1969), Moravian Gallery in Brno

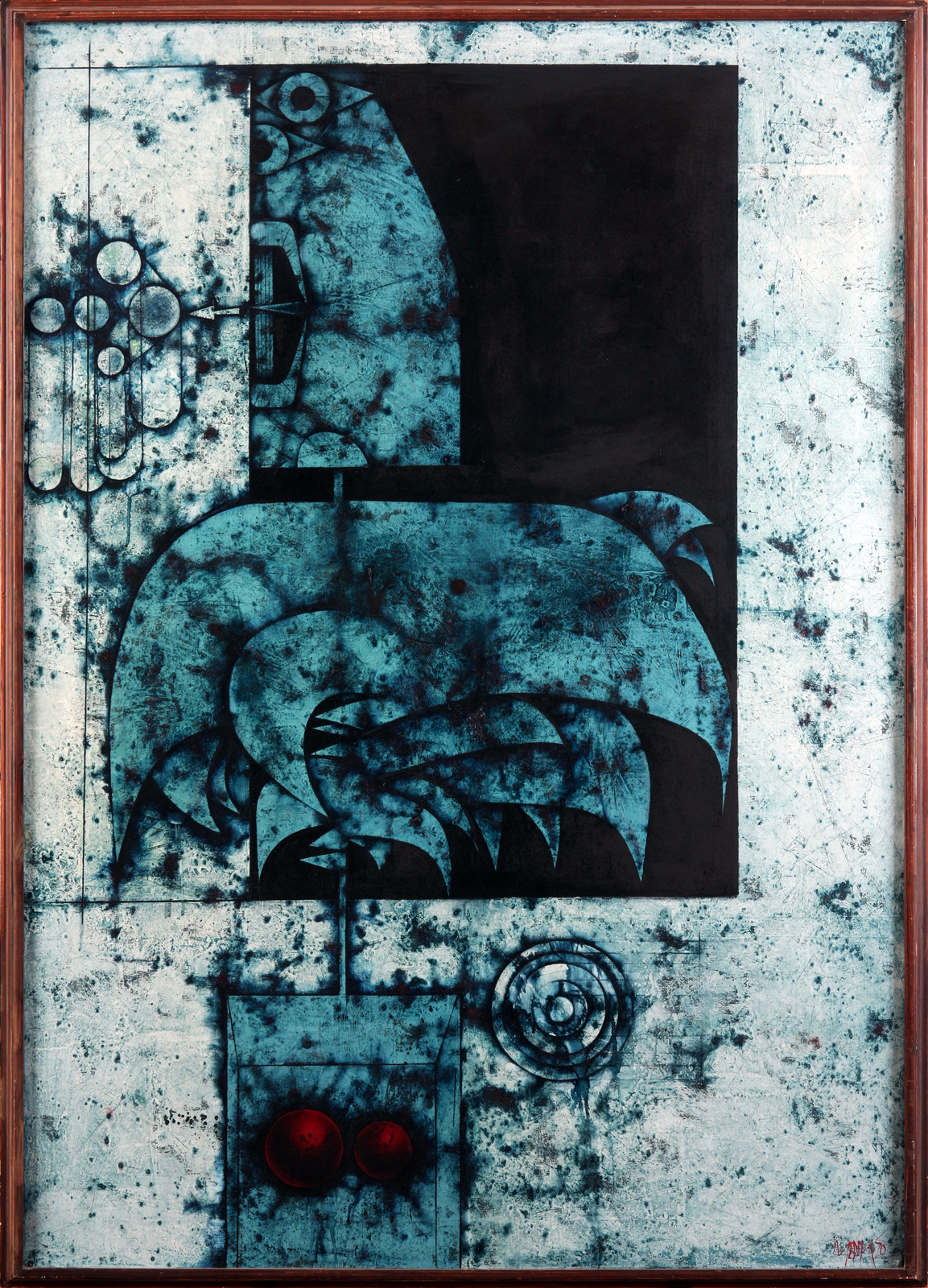
Mikuláš Medek, Thirsty Angel in the Window (1970), Gallery of Modern Art in Hradec Králové

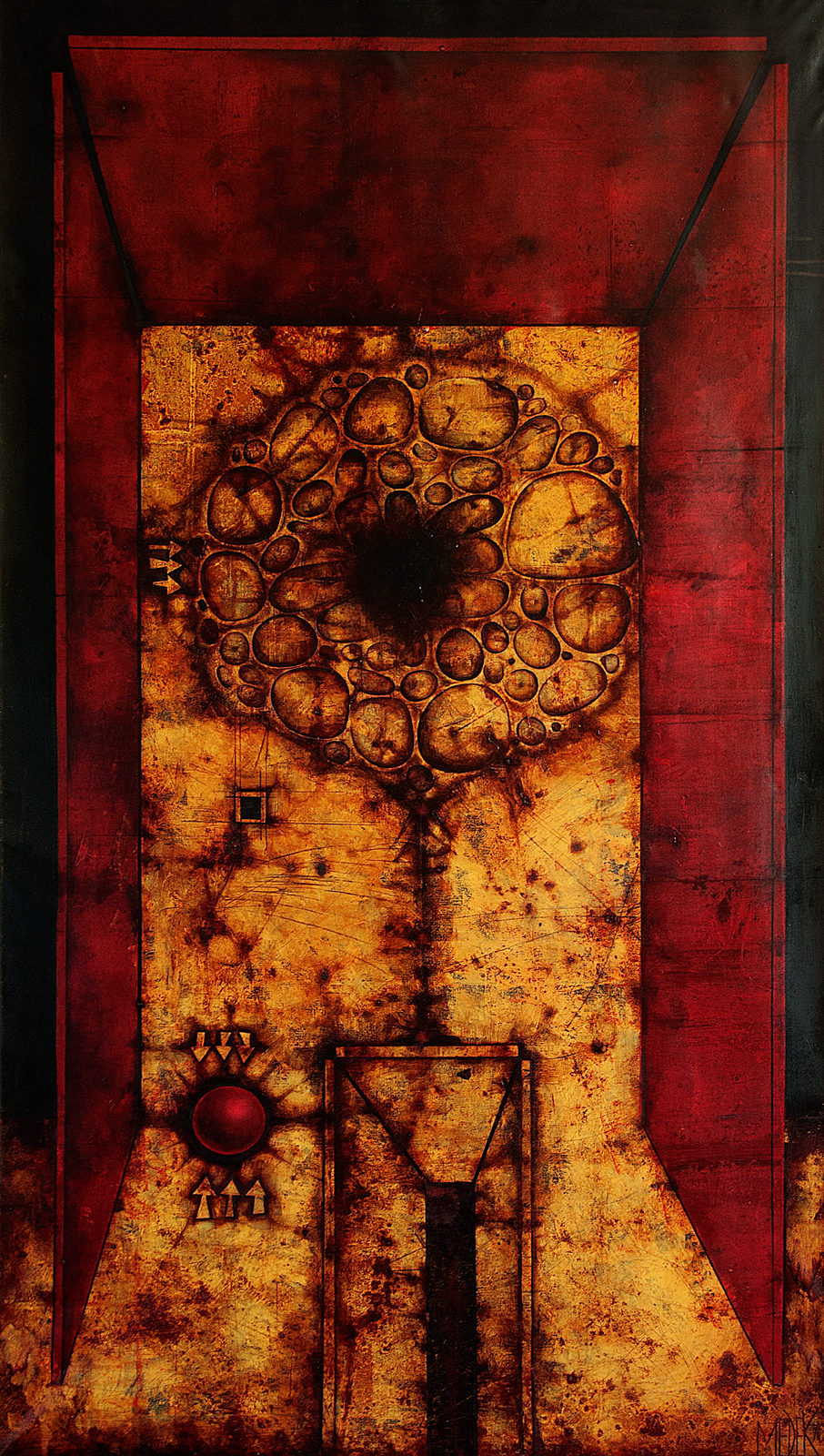
Mikuláš Medek, Large Iviška (1970), Kodl Gallery, Prague

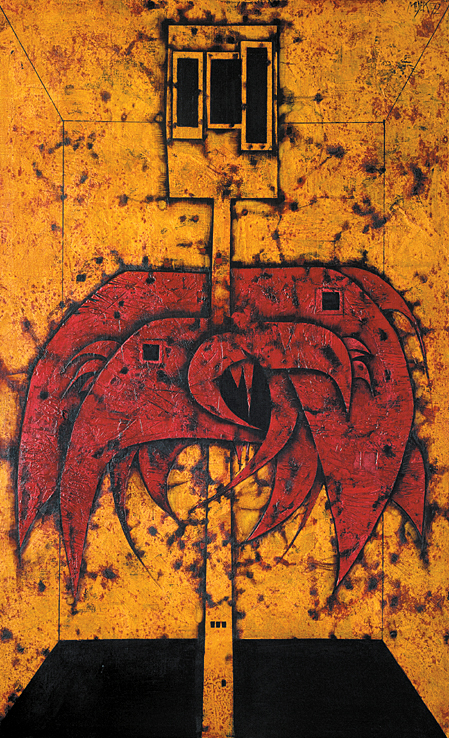
Mikuláš Medek, Dancing Grim Reaper II (1972), private collection

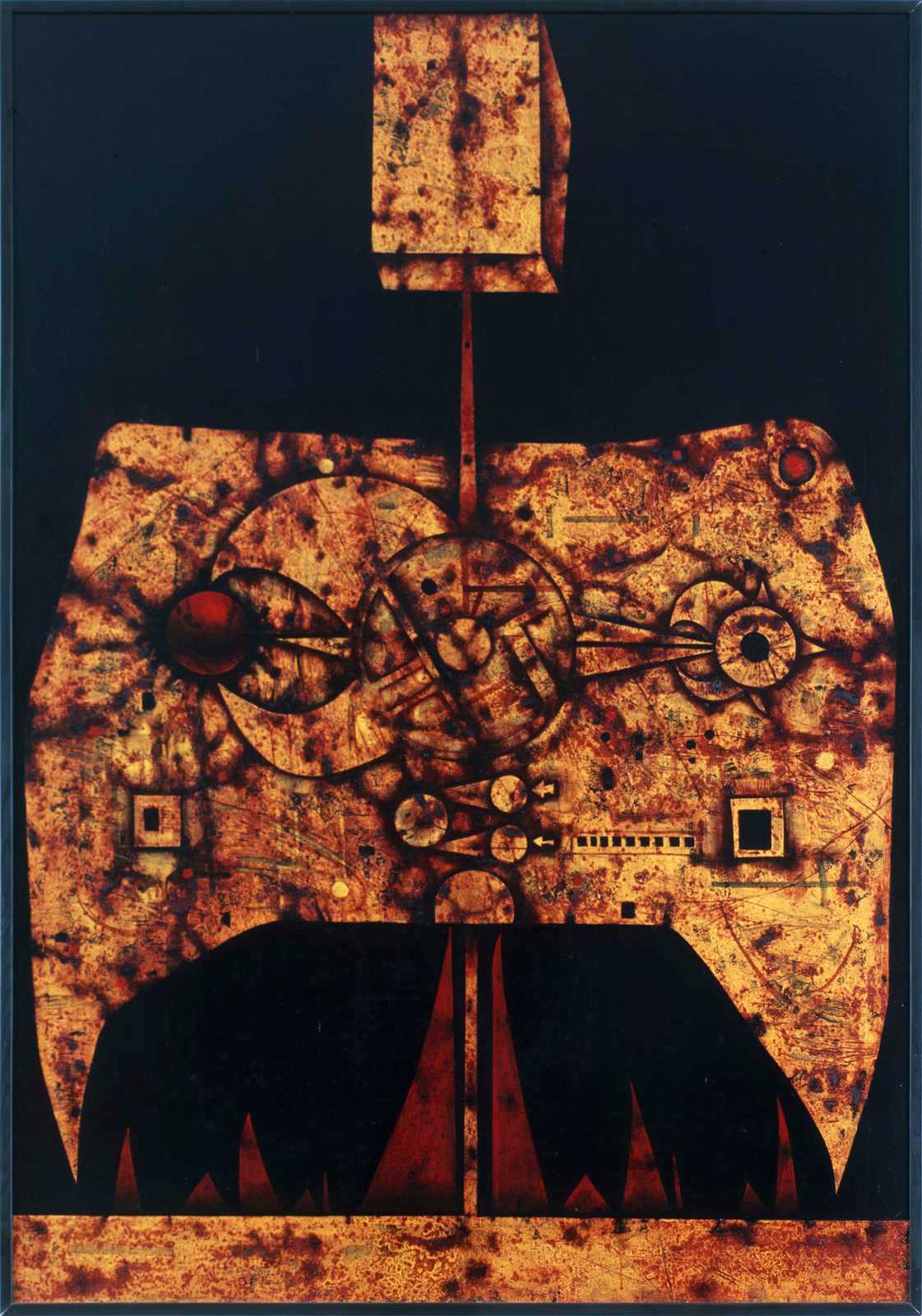
Mikuláš Medek, Angel of the Evil Birds I (1972), private collection

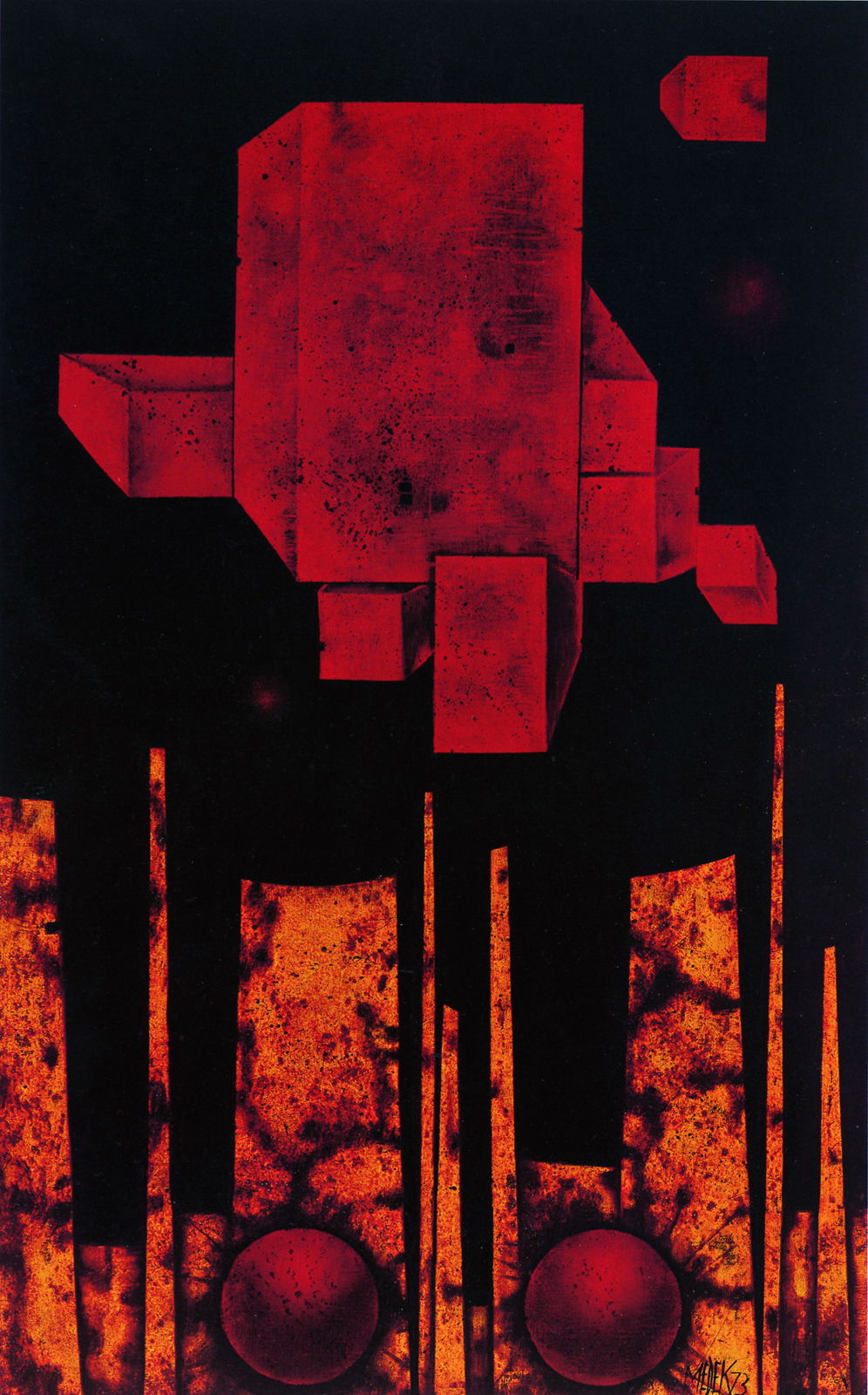
Mikuláš Medek, Moving Grave IV (1973), Gallery of Modern Art in Roudnice nad Labem

=== Medek's painting technique ===
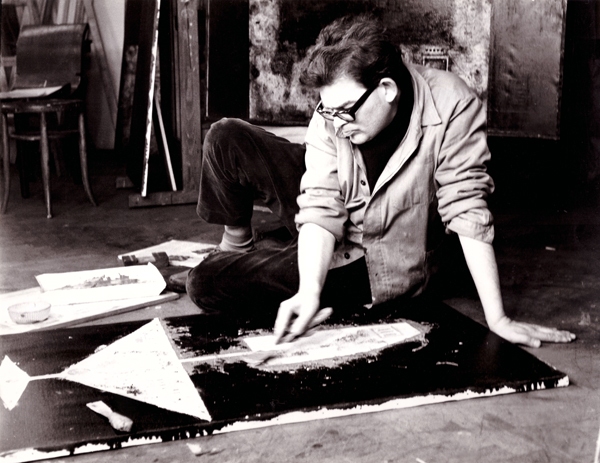
Emila Medková – Mikuláš Medek in studio, 1965–1966

Early works of smaller formats are on cardboard, plywood or masonite, later works exclusively on canvas. He chalked the panels with added alabaster plaster and grinded them to achieve a smooth surface. He assembled the frame himself and began work on the painting by stretching and preparing the canvas, gouging and scribing with floating chalk. During the period of imaginative and figurative painting, he used a thickly bound canvas and added white chalk for a vibrant ground. For preparatory ink drawings, he painted with oil paints in light glaze layers. For figurative paintings, he made preparatory drawings on wrapping paper and then transferred these to canvas. He painted the figures with oily egg tempera and the background with oil paints. As an unregistered painter in the 1950s, Medek had trouble sourcing materials, so he removed some canvases from the frame and reused them from the opposite side.

At the end of the 1950s, he began to use synthetic enamel paint (Industrol) diluted with turpentine to create the plastic structure of the painting and painted the first layers of the painting horizontally on the ground. He mixed the synthetic enamel with floating chalk or sand and stiffened and coloured with oil paints. He did the base layer with a wide spatula and then used smaller spatulas to carve out the edges of the drawing and details. When dry, he applied a thin layer of oil paint over the enamel layer and gradually made décalque with an attached newspaper and brush, sometimes repeatedly. After the ground had cured, he did the actual painting with flat brushes and oil paints. He used Stolo oil paints, mostly Paris blue, cadmium and dark kraplak. After the painting had completely dried, he varnished it with damask varnish.

Until the mid-1950s, he marked the paintings with an exact date; later, he signed the paintings after the fact for exhibition or sale, and the dating may be inaccurate.

=== Commissions - works in public space ===
- 1963 Painting Penetration of Space (182 x 401 cm) for the Czech Airlines office in Damascus
- 1963 fourteen-piece Pano (248 x 1701 cm) for the Czech Airlines office in Košice
- 1963–1965 Cross, altarpiece, dean's church of St. Peter and Paul in Jedovnice. The frame of the painting is the work of Jan Koblasa.
- 1966 Wall painting of Fragility (Blue Rotation of the Universe) for a travel agency in Paris (one part now in Prague Castle)
- 1969 Signals, 319 x 1747 cm, originally for the transit restaurant of Prague – Ruzyně Airport, now in the possession of the National Gallery
- 1970 Sacred Heart of the Lord, altarpiece, 180 x 140 cm, Chapel of the Divine Heart of the Lord in Kotvrdovice
- 1970 The Great Iviska, 215 x 120 cm, for a travel agency in New York City
- 1971 The Fourteen Stations of the Cross, 122 x 1050 cm, St. Joseph's Church in Senetářov
- 1973 Mosaic of the Sun on the facade of a school in Žďár nad Sázavou (made by the workshops of the Centre for arts and crafts)
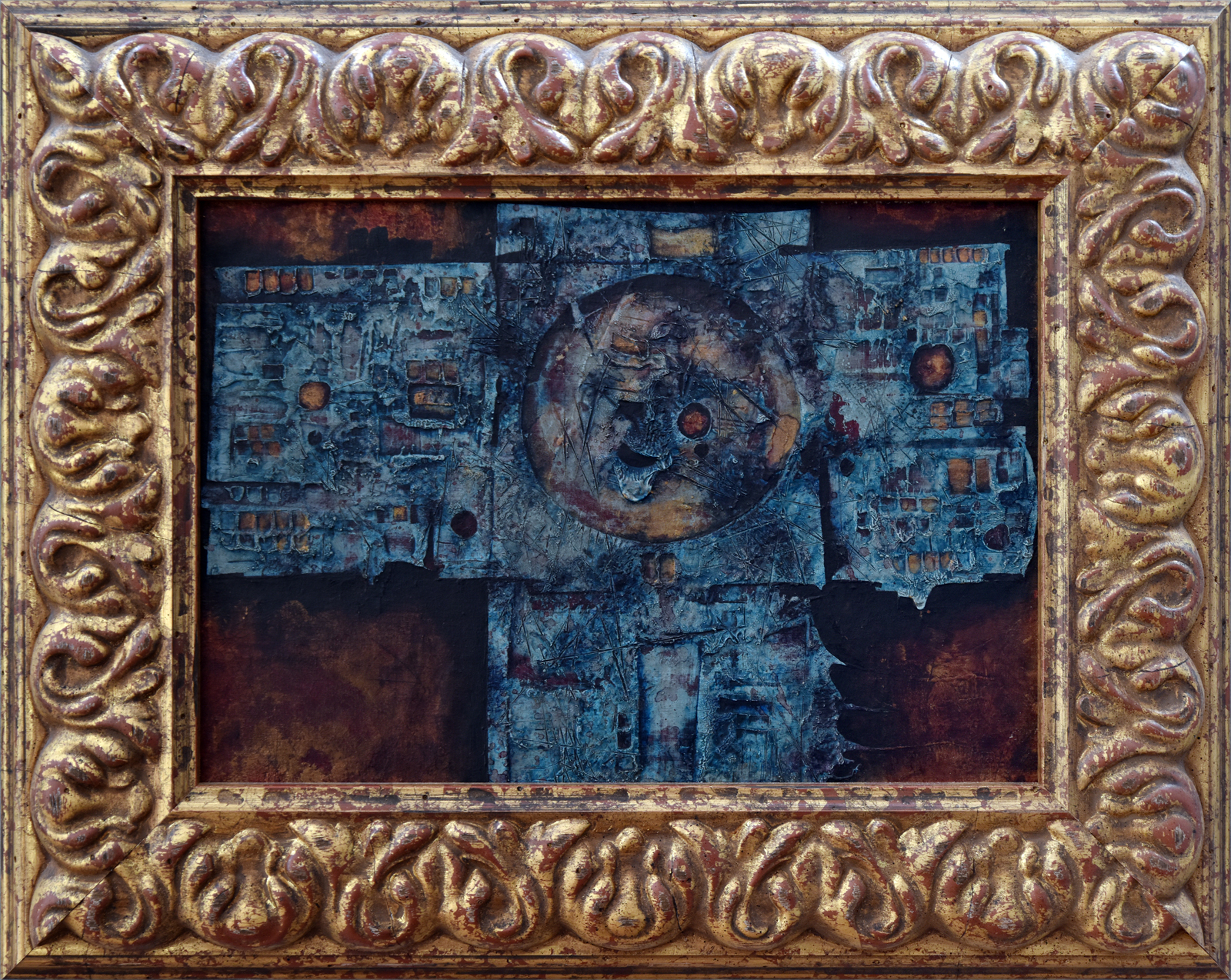
Mikuláš Medek, Romanesque Cross (around 1963)

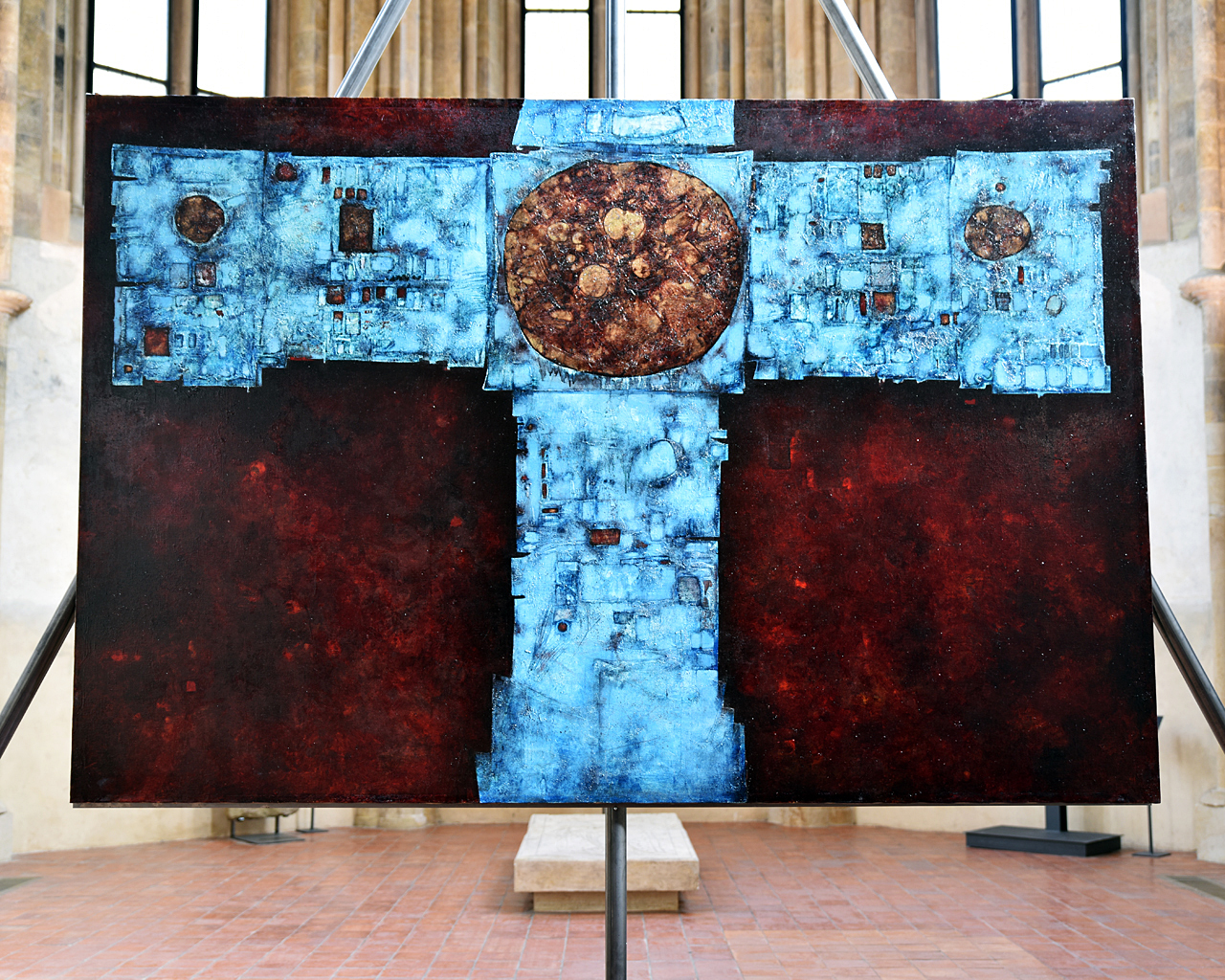
Mikuláš Medek, Cross, altarpiece in Jedovnice (1963)

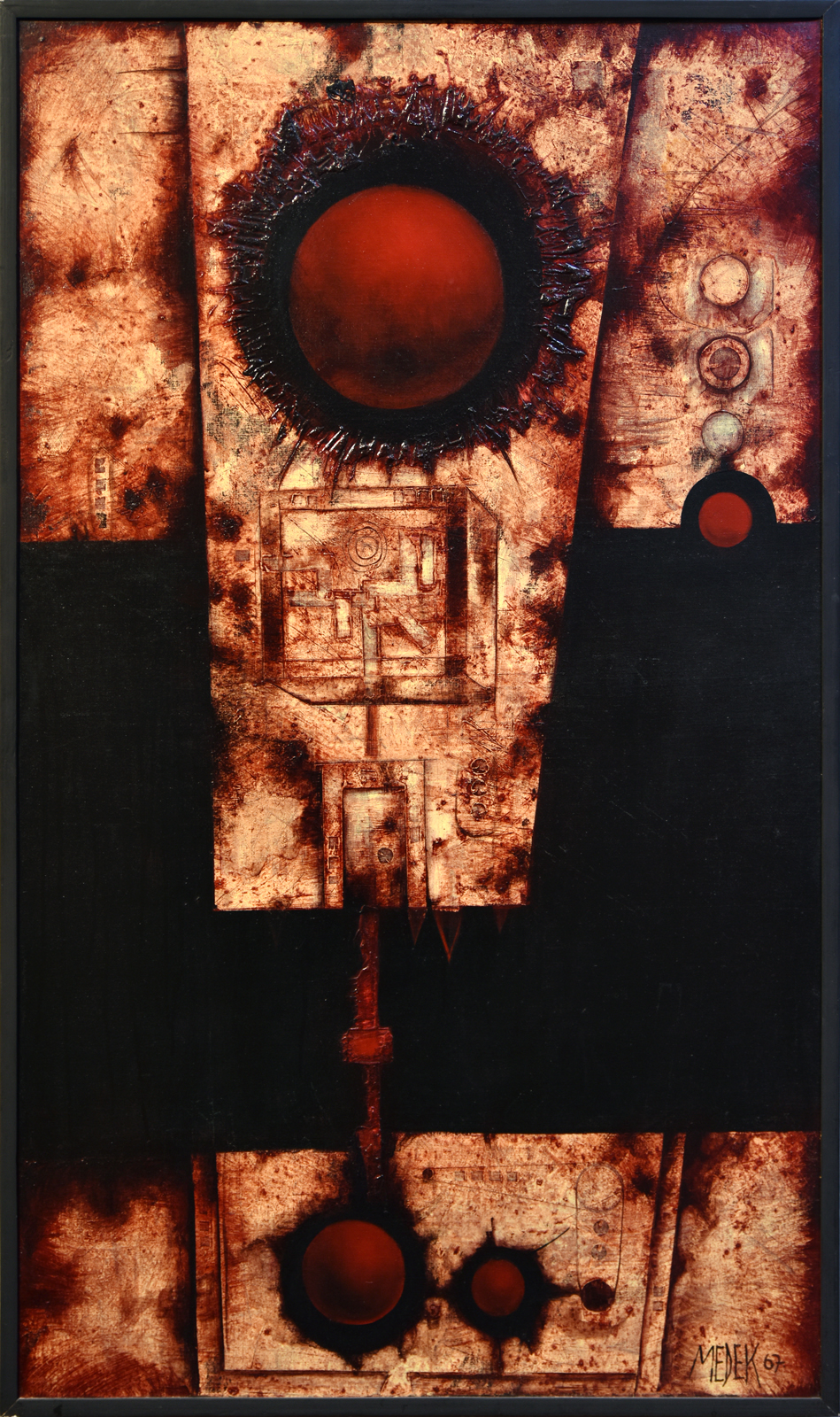
Mikuláš Medek, Furious Monstrance II (1967)

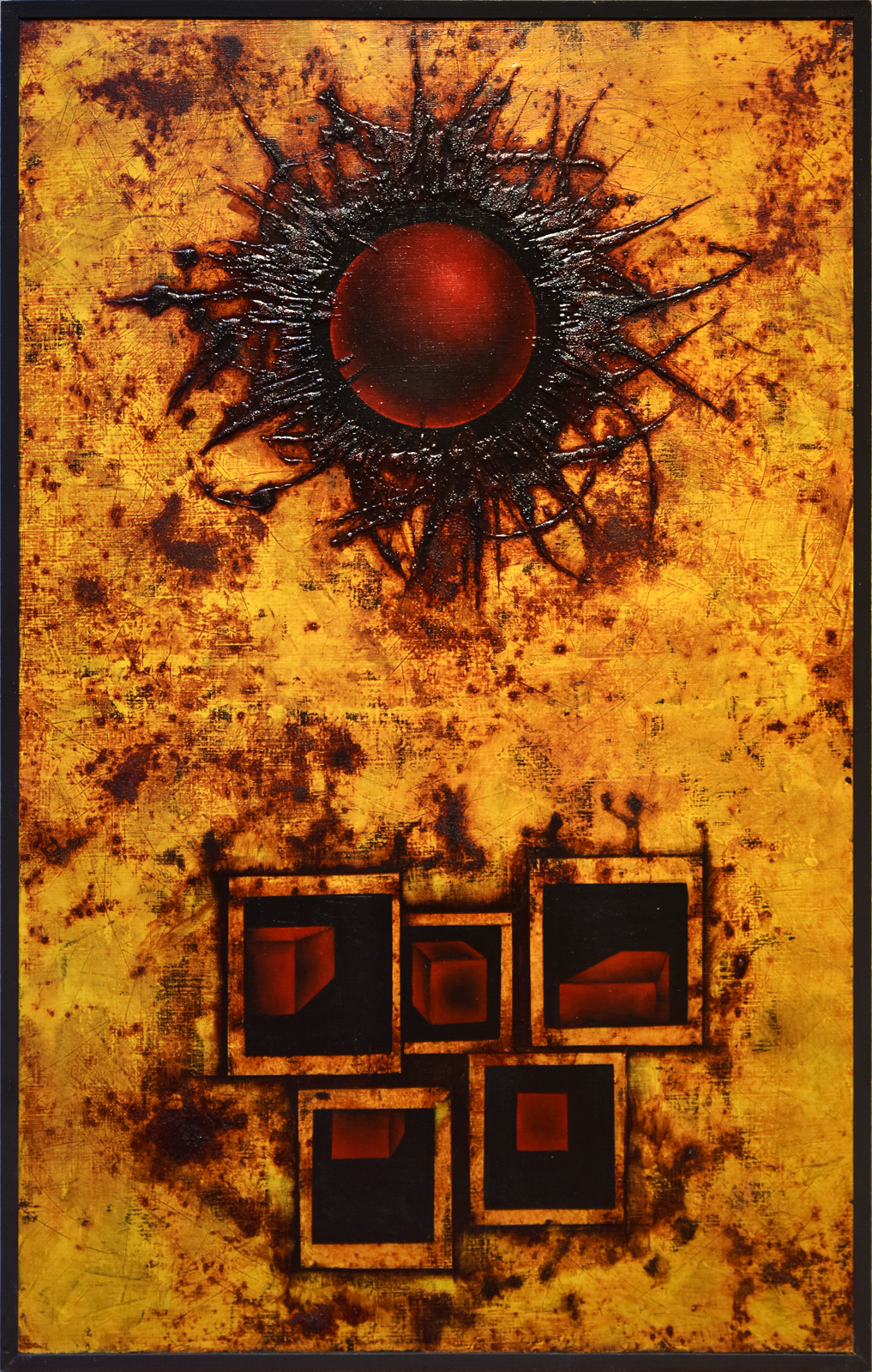
Mikuláš Medek, Study of the altarpiece in Kotvrdovice II (1968)

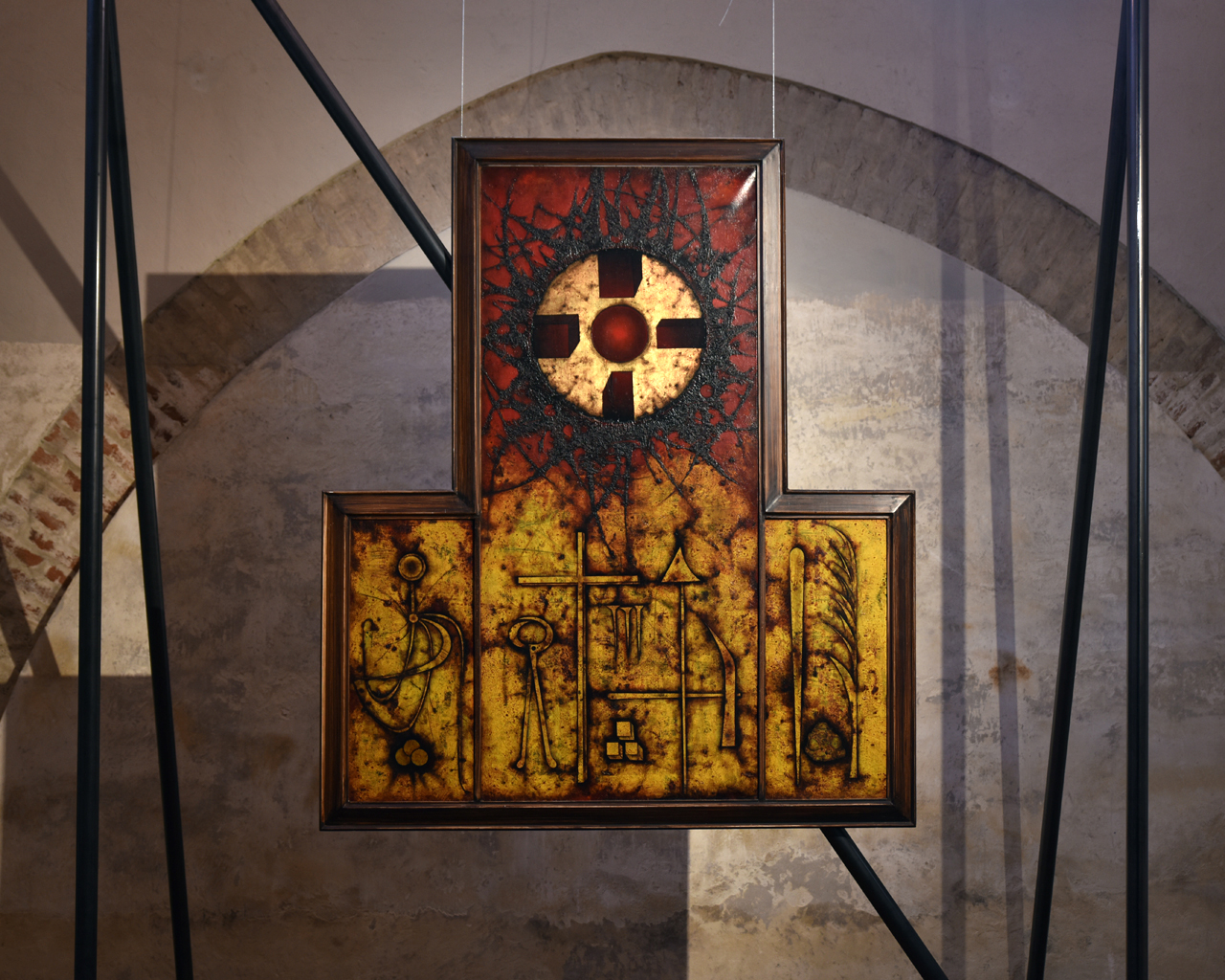
Mikuláš Medek, Altarpiece for the Chapel of the Divine Heart of the Lord in Kotvrdovice (1970)

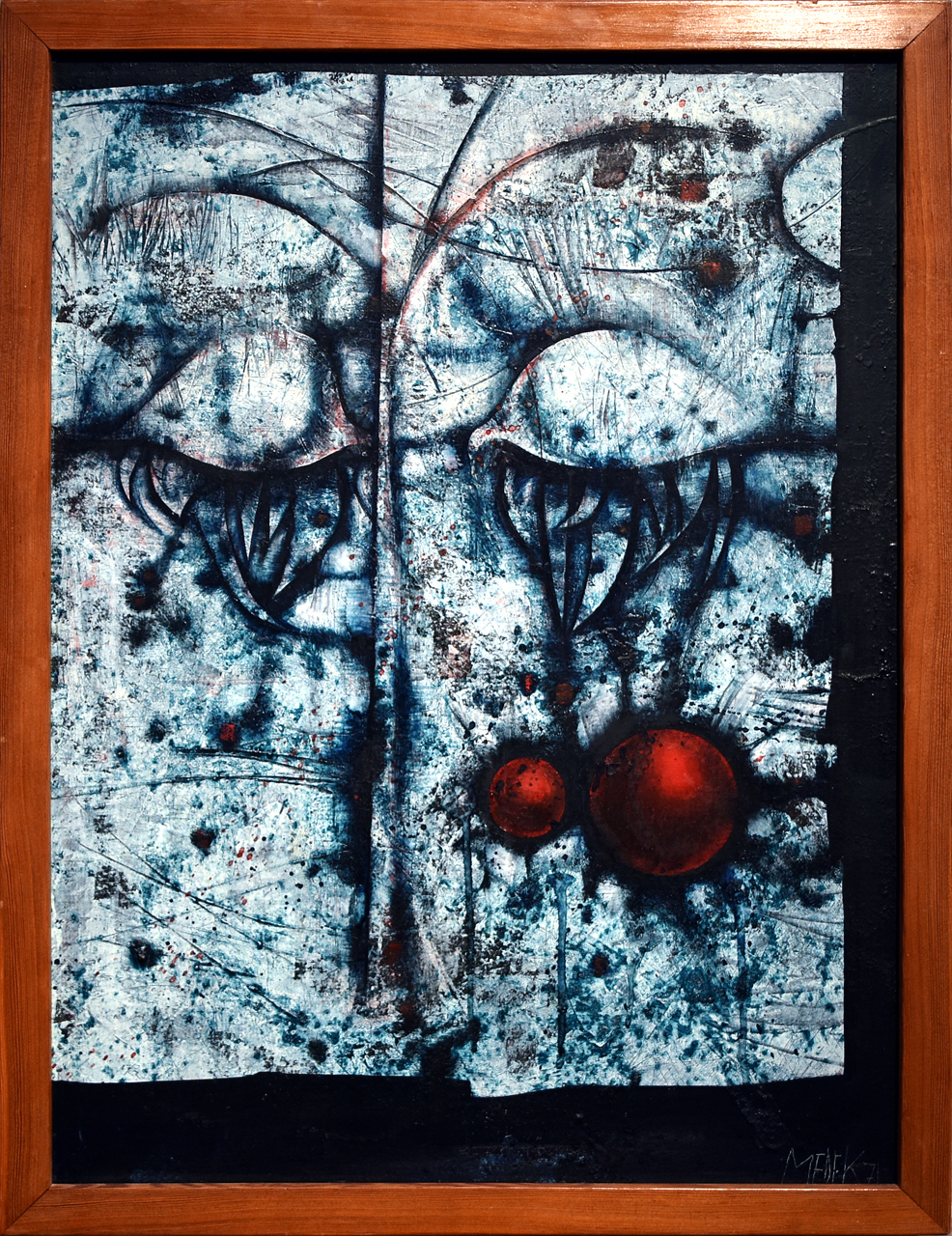
Mikuláš Medek, Blue Veil I (1971)

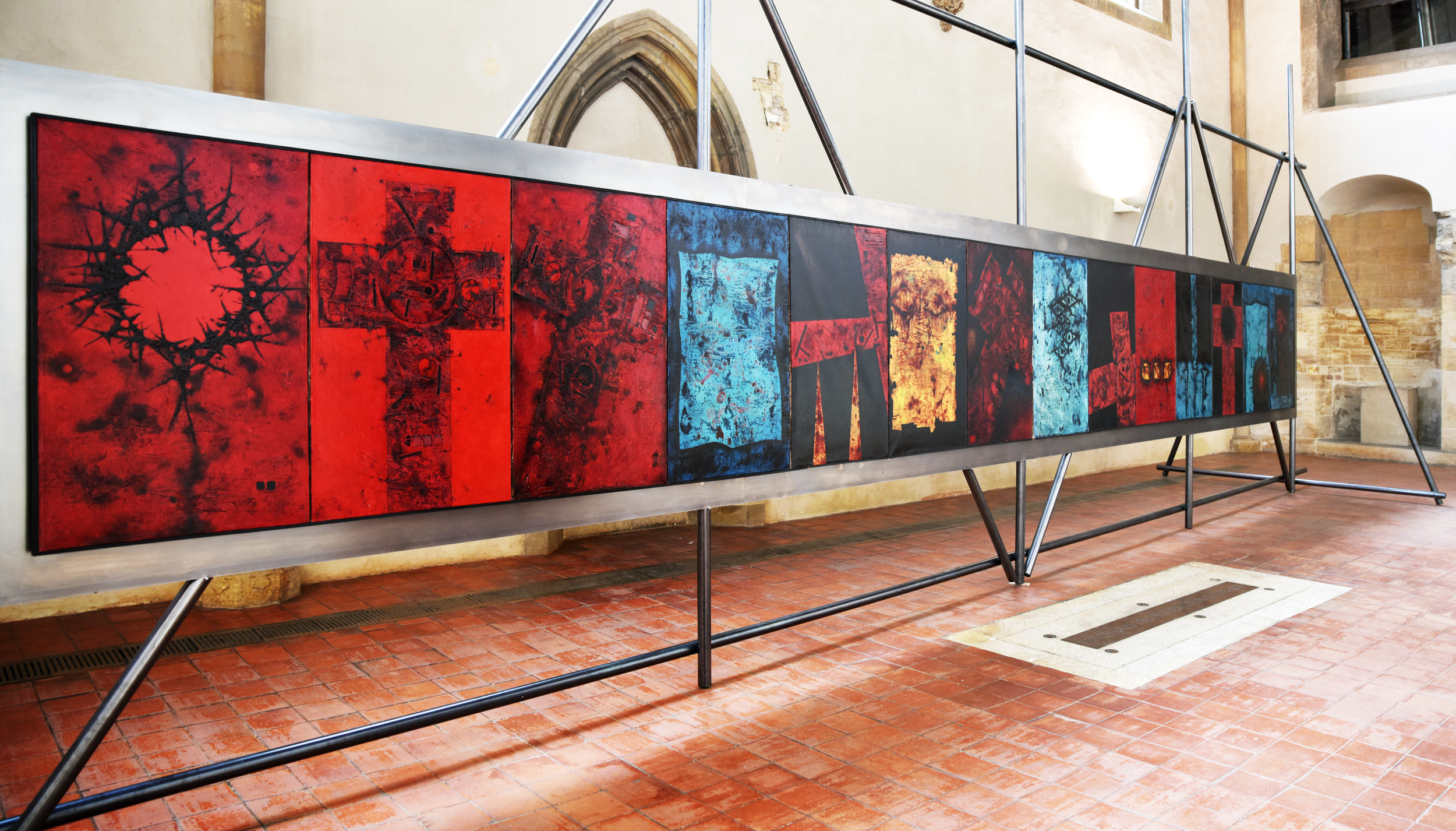
Mikuláš Medek, 14 Stations of the Cross for the Church of St. Joseph in Senetářov (1971)

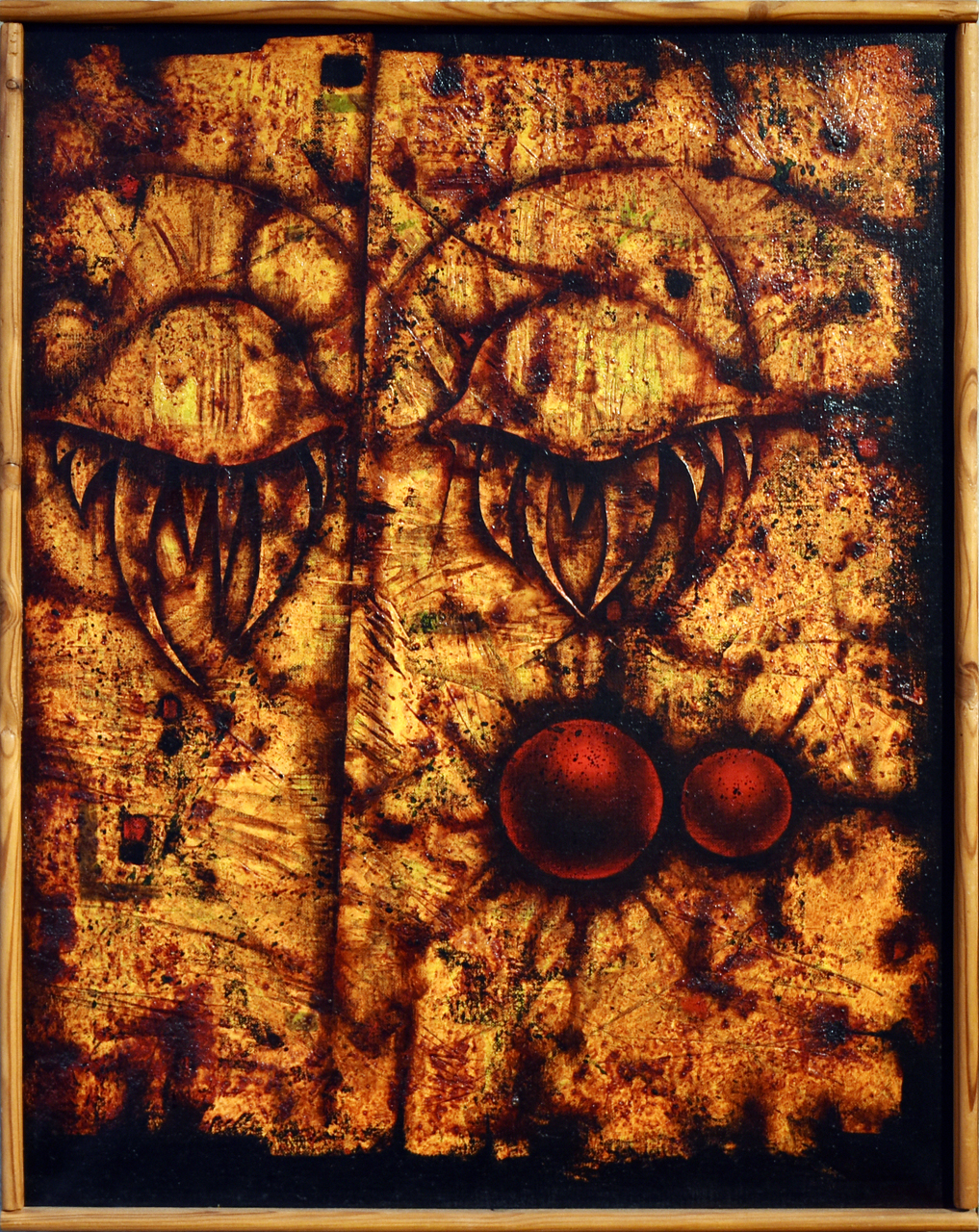
Mikuláš Medek, Veil I (1972)

=== Book illustrations ===
- Evelyn Waugh, The Loved One, World Literature No. 4, 1957 (under the pseudonym Dagmar Kozakova)
- Tage Aurell, Three Stories, World Literature No. 2, 1962
- Jorge Luis Borges, The Library of Babel, Labyrinth (Committee of Western Science Fiction Stories), SNKLU, Prague, 1962
- Taijun Takeda, The Luminous Moss, World Literature No. 5, 1964
- Otokar Březina, Hands, Blok Publishing House, Brno, 1965
- Vladimír Holan, Death and Dream and Word (From Macha's Region), North Bohemian Regional Publishing House, Liberec 1965
- Pain (verses from 1949 to 1955), Československý spisovatel Publishing house, Prague 1966
- František Langer, Painterly Tales (Volume I.), Československý spisovatel Publishing house, Prague 1966
- Magnetic Fields, KPP, Československý spisovatel Publishing house, Prague 1967
- Zdeněk Lorenc, Hollow Lamp, Československý spisovatel Publishing house, Prague 1967
- Vladimír Holan, Babyloniaca, Odeon, Prague 1968
- Rio Preisner, Kapilary, Blok Publishing House, Brno 1968
- Jiří Mahen, The Moon (Fantasy), Odeon, Prague 1968
- Boris Pasternak, Doctor Zhivago (excerpts), World Literature No. 1, 1969
- Jiřina Hauková, Letorosty (Selection of poetry 1940–1965), Československý spisovatel Publishing house, Prague 1970
- Franz Werfel, Song of Bernadette, Vyšehrad Publishing House, Prague 1989 (published in 1972 without illustrations)

==== Unpublished ====
- Alfred Jarry, The Supermale, 1947
- Lautréamont, Songs of Maldor, 1947
- Leonard Frank, The Song of the Fifth of May, 1949
- Karel Hynek, Icarus Plays, 1951
- Henry Miller, The Tropic of Cancer, 1968

=== Author's exhibitions ===
- 1963 Paintings and sculptures by Jan Koblasa and Mikuláš Medek from 1959 to 1963, Regional Museum of National History, Teplice Castle
- 1965 Mikuláš Medek: Paintings 1947–1965, Nová síň Gallery, Prague
- 1966 Mikuláš Medek: Paintings 1961–1966, Unified Racing Club ROH, Ústí nad Orlicí
- 1966 Mikuláš Medek: Twenty previously unexhibited paintings from 1960 to 1965, Regional Gallery Liberec
- 1967 Mikulás Medek, Galleria La Bertesca, Genoa
- 1969 Mikuláš Medek: Drawings and Illustrations, Small Gallery of the Czechoslovak Writer, Prague
- 1969 Mikuláš Medek, Museen der Stadt Regensburg, Regensburg
- 1969 Mikuláš Medek, Galleria La Bertesca, Genoa
- 1969 Mikuláš Medek: Designers of Towers, Václav Špála Gallery, Prague
- 1969 Mikuláš Medek: Paintings 1944–1969, Regional Gallery, Hradec Králové
- 1970 Mikuláš Medek, Kunstkreis Leinfelden, Leinfelden-Echterdingen
- 1975 Mikuláš Medek: Moving Graves, Mikuláš Medek Studio, Prague
- 1976 Mikuláš Medek, Galerie ASA AG, Zurich
- 1976 Mikuláš Medek 1926–1974, Museum Bochum
- 1988 Mikuláš Medek: Paintings 1944–1974, Gallery of Fine Arts, Roudnice nad Labem
- 1989 Mikuláš Medek, Municipal Museum, Aš
- 1990 Mikuláš Medek: Collected Paintings, Brno House of Art
- 1990 Mikuláš Medek: Collected Paintings, Municipal Library, Prague
- 1990 Mikuláš Medek: Selected works. Selected Paintings, Alšova jihočeská galerie in Hluboká nad Vltavou
- 1990/1991 Mikuláš Medek: Selected Works. Paintings, Regional Gallery of Highlands in Jihlava
- 1991 Mikuláš Medek, Gallery of Fine Arts in Ostrava
- 1991 Mikuláš Medek: Selection from his work. Paintings, Cabinet of Graphic Arts, Olomouc
- 2002 Mikuláš Medek, Rudolfinum Gallery, Prague (the exhibition was prematurely closed due to the flood of 11.8.2002.)
- 2012 Mikuláš Medek: CSA Košice 1963–64, Dvorak Sec Contemporary, Prague
- 2014 Mikuláš Medek: Moving Graves, Galerie Zdeněk Sklenář Chambre à part, Prague
- 2016 Mikuláš Medek: Portrait of Jiřina Hauková, 1967, Museum of East Bohemia in Hradec Králové
- 2017 Mikuláš Medek: Nightingale for Dinner, Gema Gallery, Prague
- 2018/2019 Mikuláš Medek, Gallery of Modern Art, Roudnice nad Labem
- 2019 Hommage à Mikuláš Medek, Galerie Zdeněk Sklenář, Prague
- 2019–2020 Mikuláš Medek: Naked in Thorns, Wallenstein Riding Hall, Veletržní Palace, Agnes Monastery, National Gallery in Prague
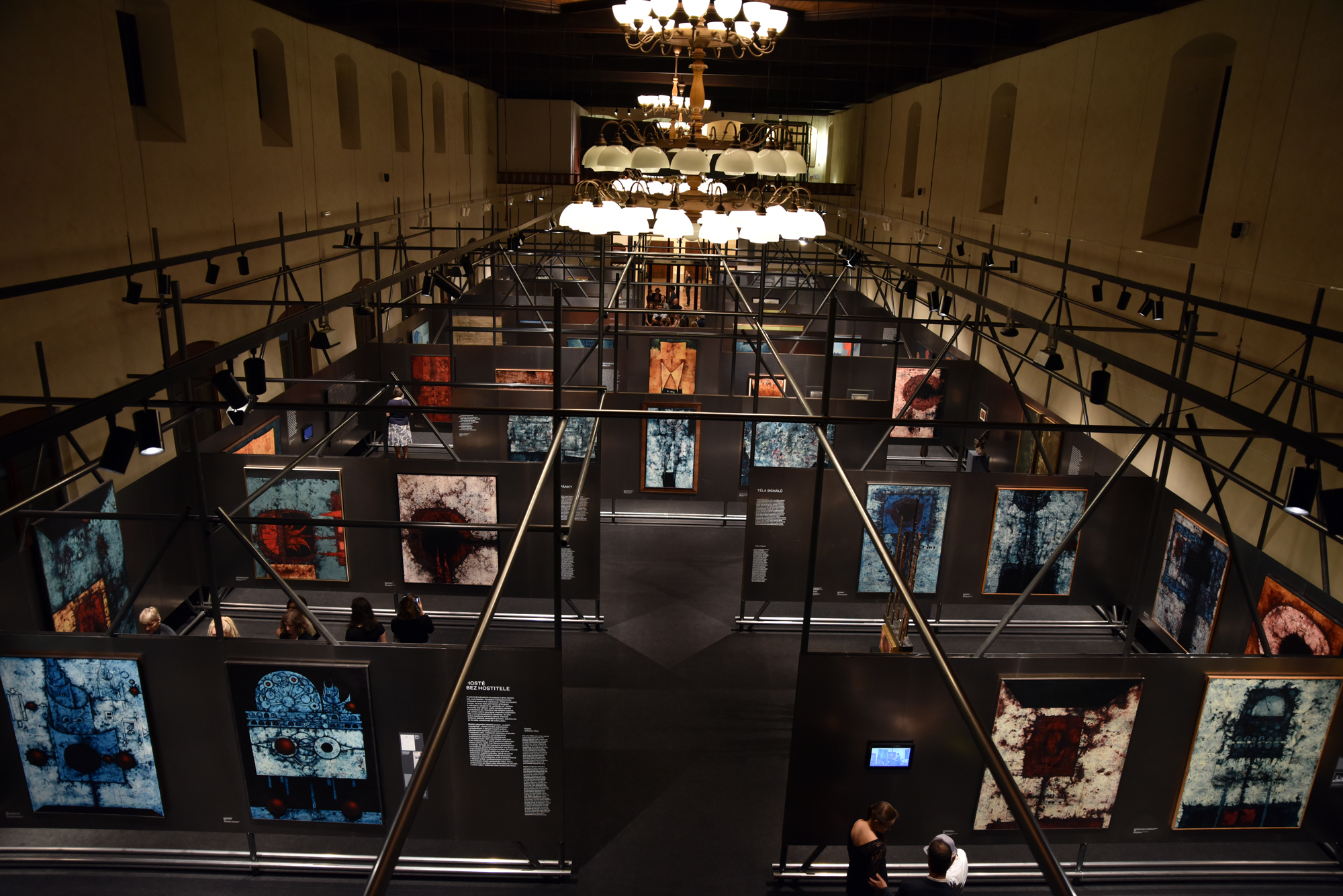
Mikuláš Medek: Naked in Thorns, Wallenstein Riding Hall (2019) I

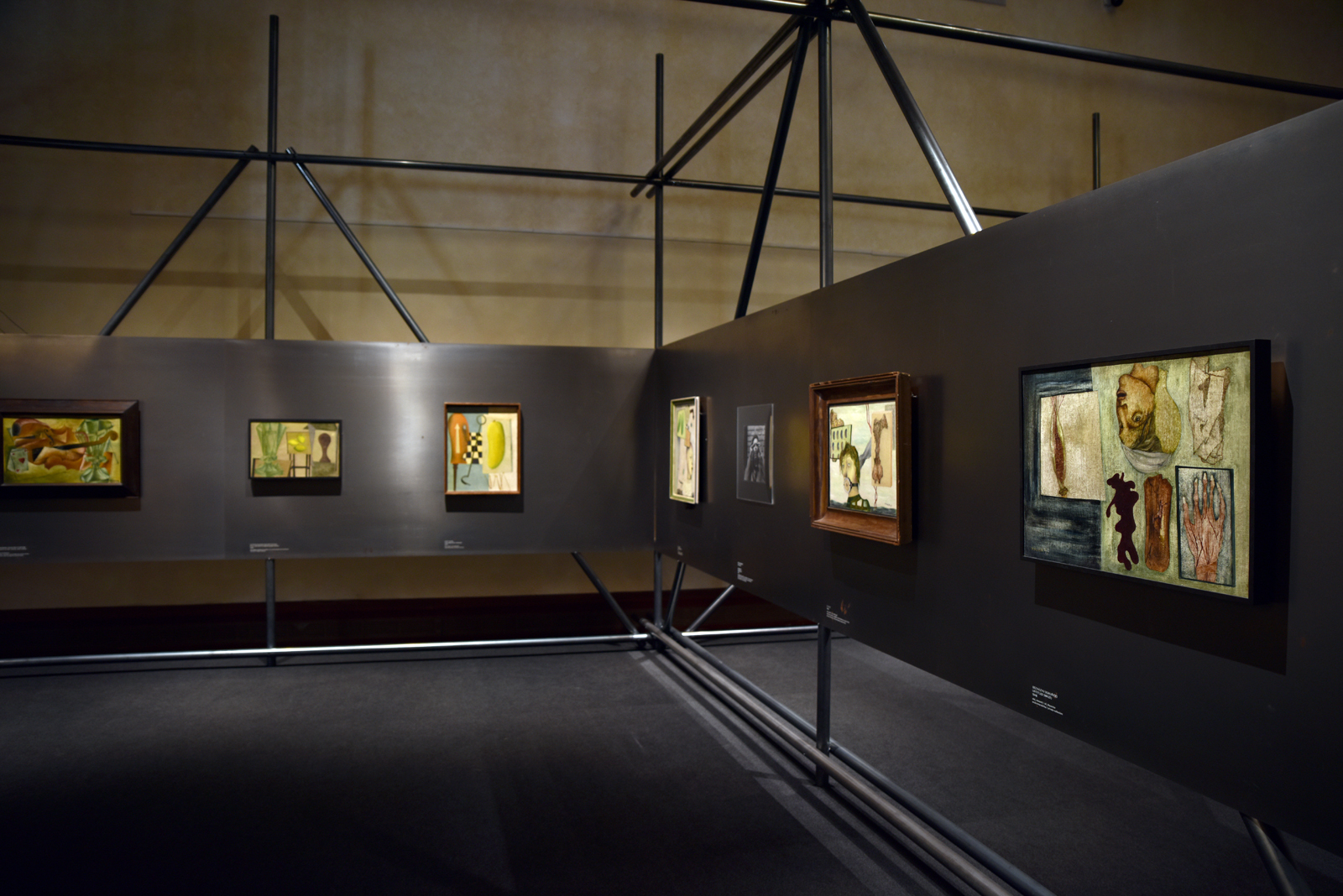
Mikuláš Medek: Naked in Thorns, Wallenstein Riding Hall (2019) II

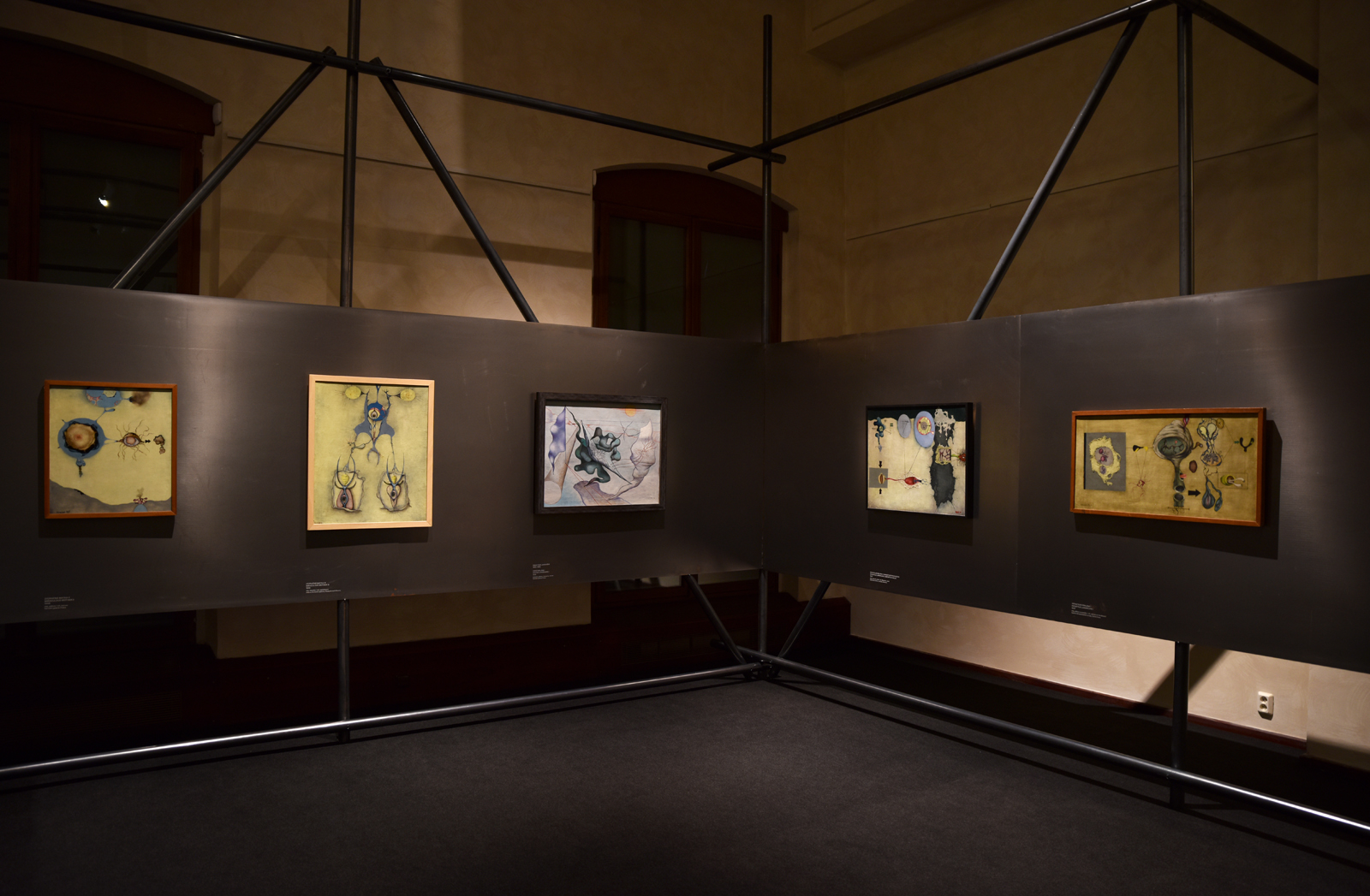
Mikuláš Medek: Naked in Thorns, Wallenstein Riding Hall (2019) III

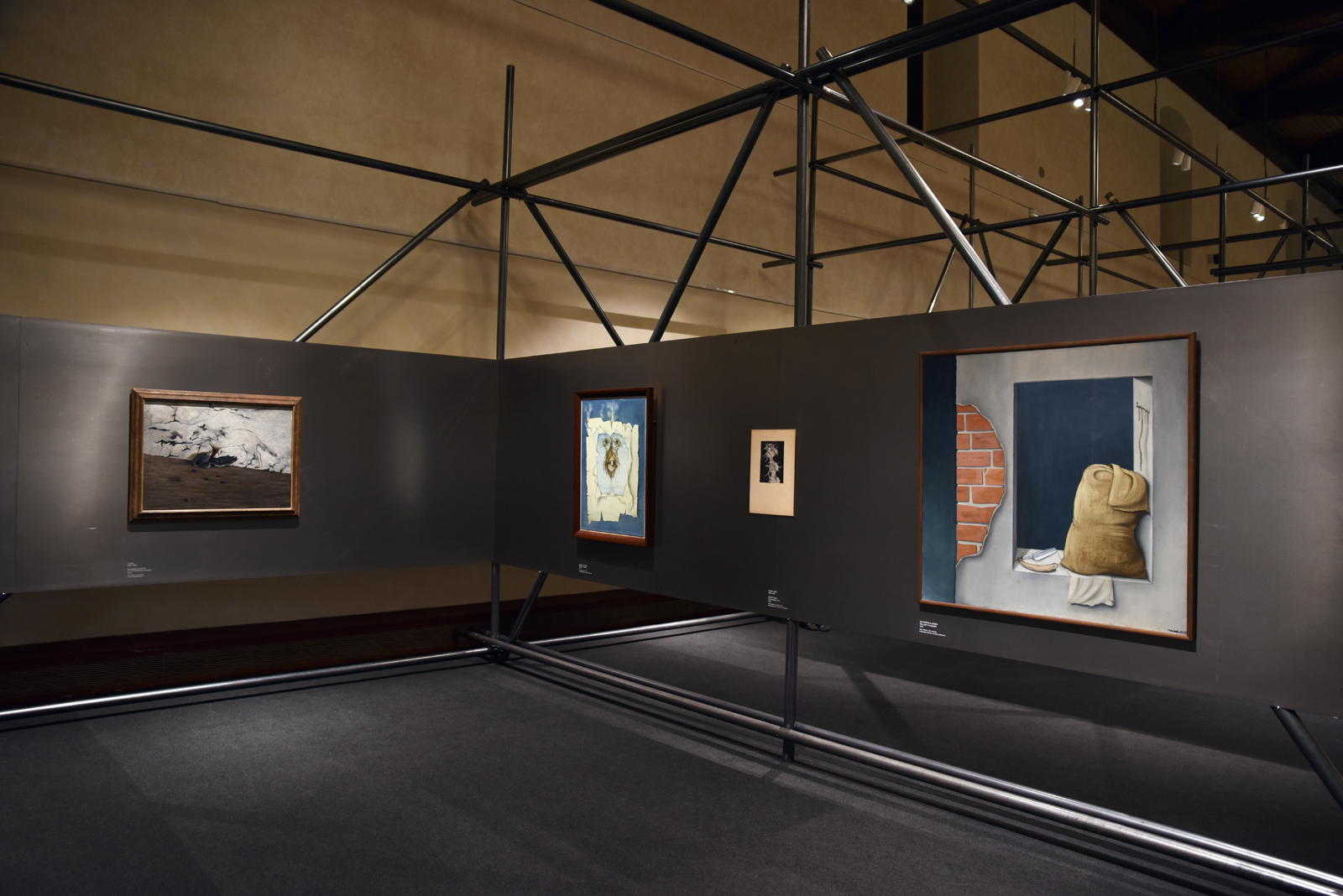
Mikuláš Medek: Naked in Thorns, Wallenstein Riding Hall (2019) IV

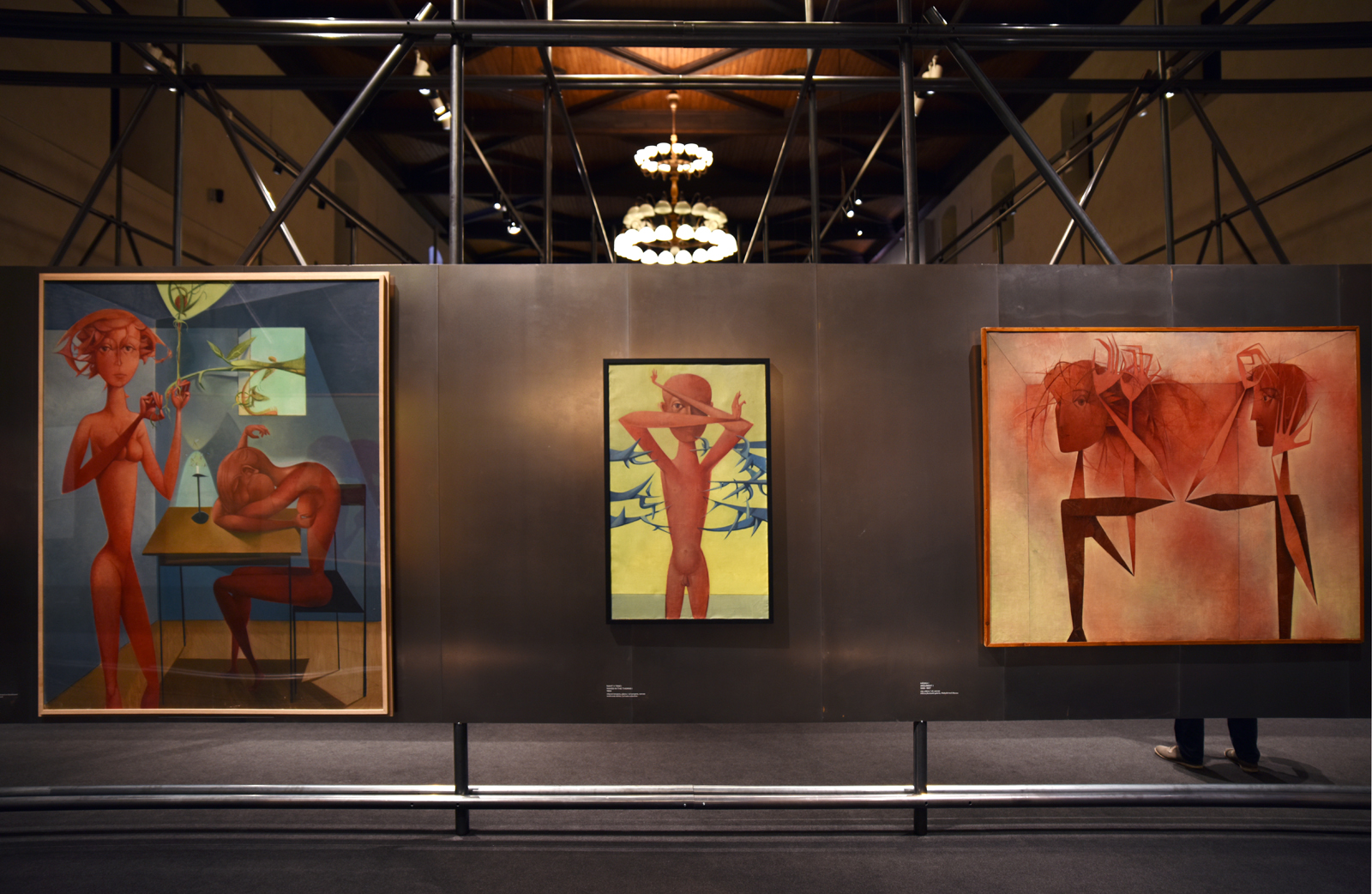
Mikuláš Medek: Naked in Thorns, Wallenstein Riding Hall (2019) V

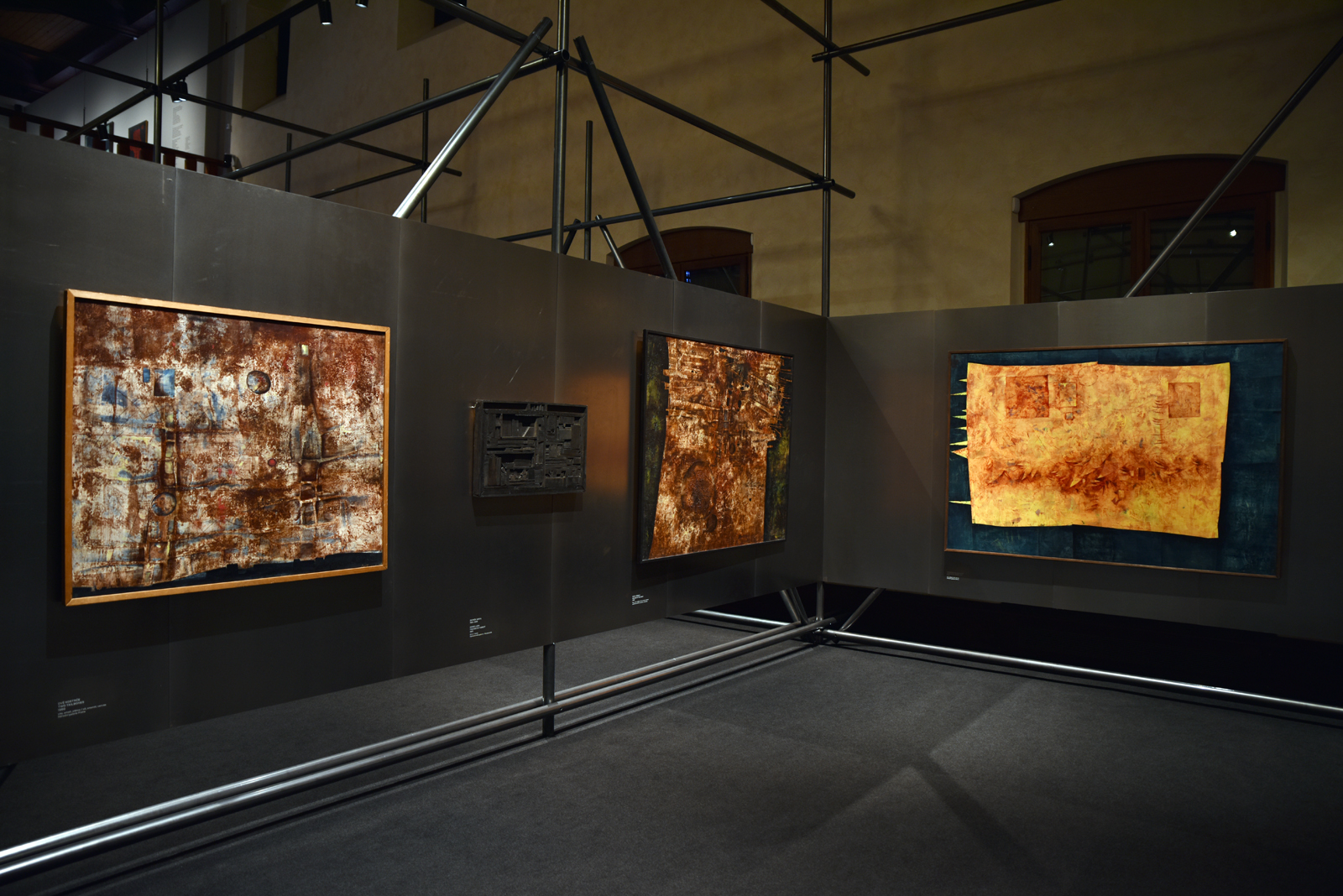
Mikuláš Medek: Naked in Thorns, Wallenstein Riding Hall (2019) VI

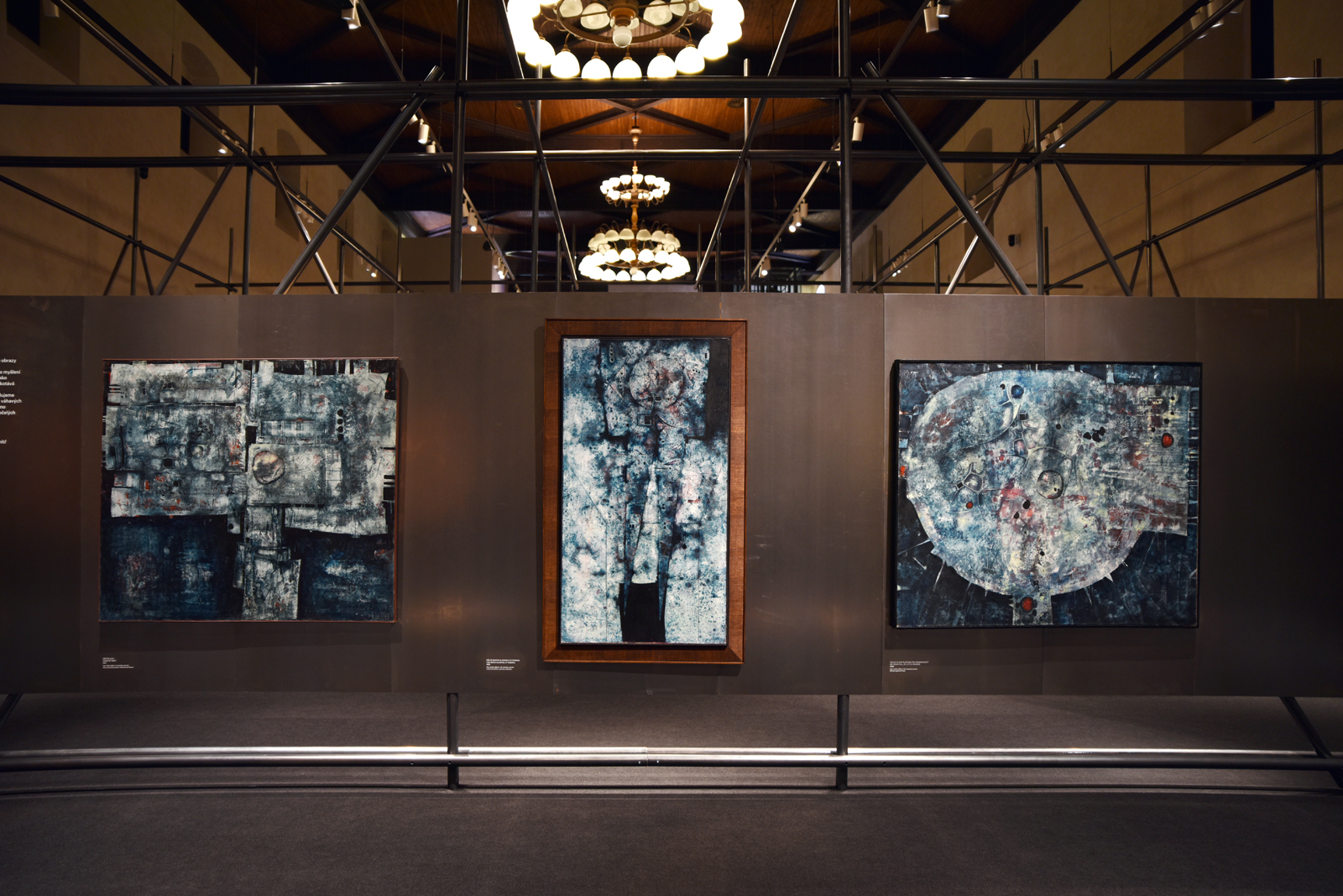
Mikuláš Medek: Naked in Thorns, Wallenstein Riding Hall (2019) VII

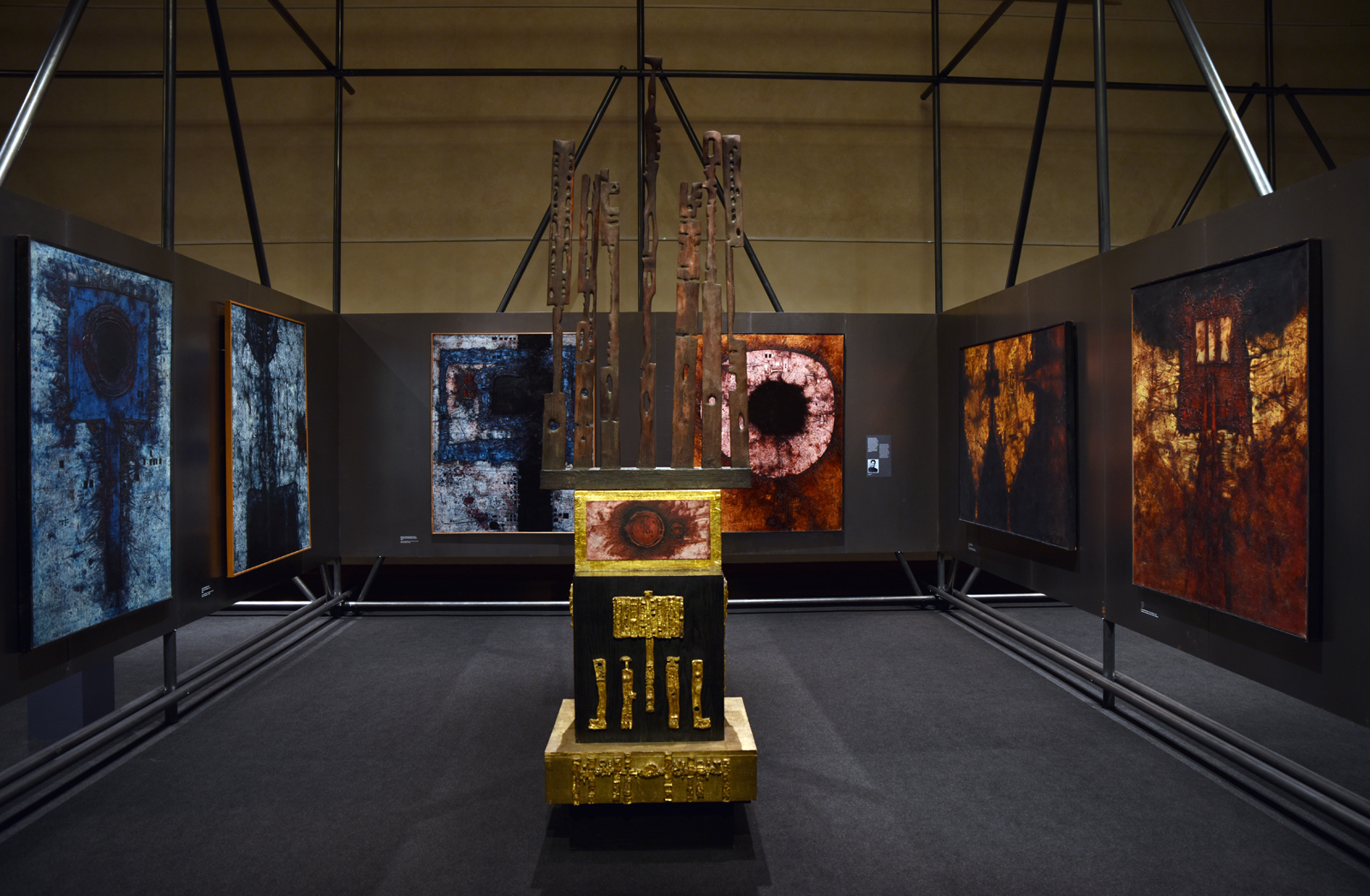
Mikuláš Medek: Naked in Thorns, Wallenstein Riding Hall (2019) VIII

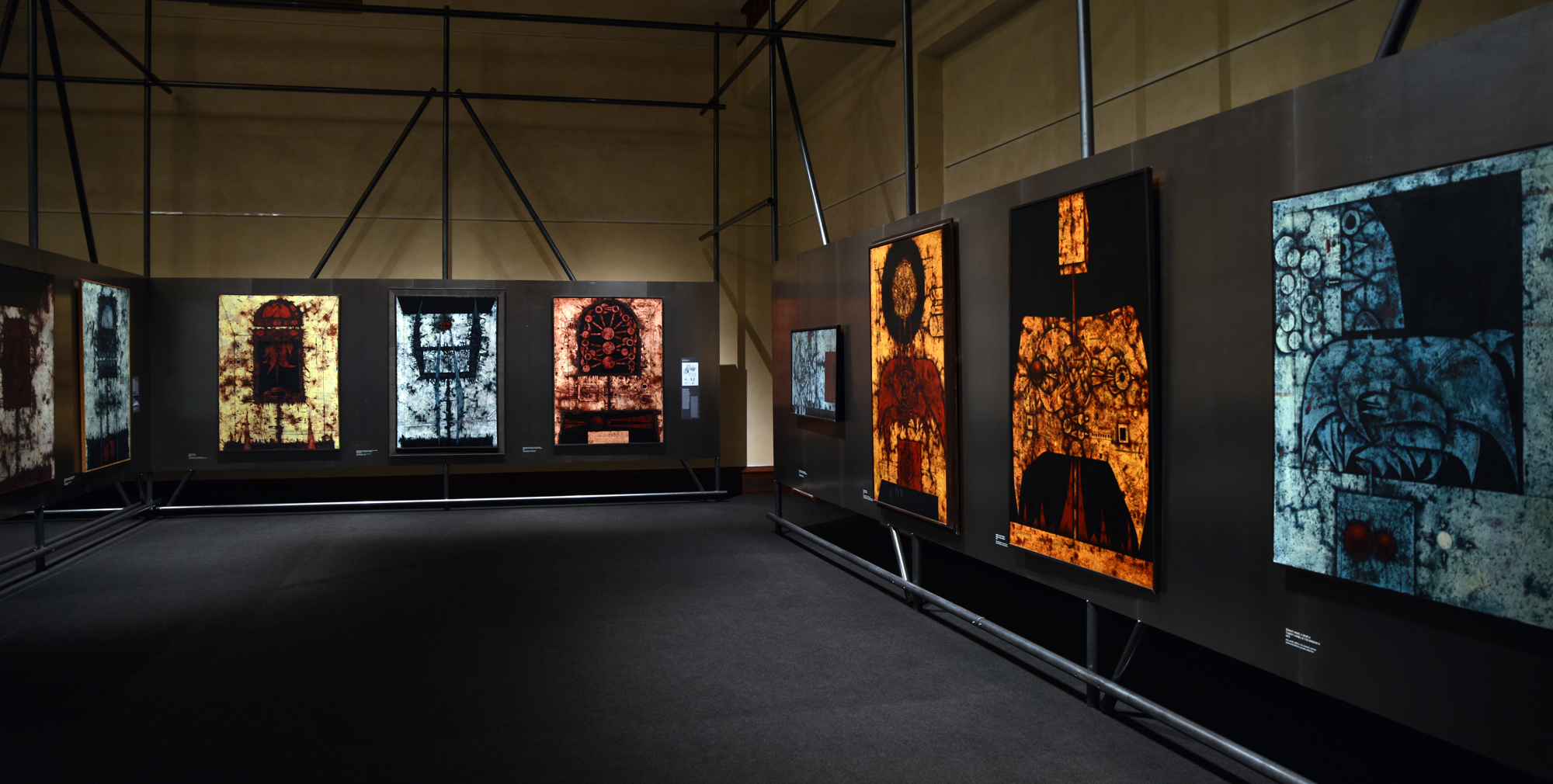
Mikuláš Medek: Naked in Thorns, Wallenstein Riding Hall (2019) IX

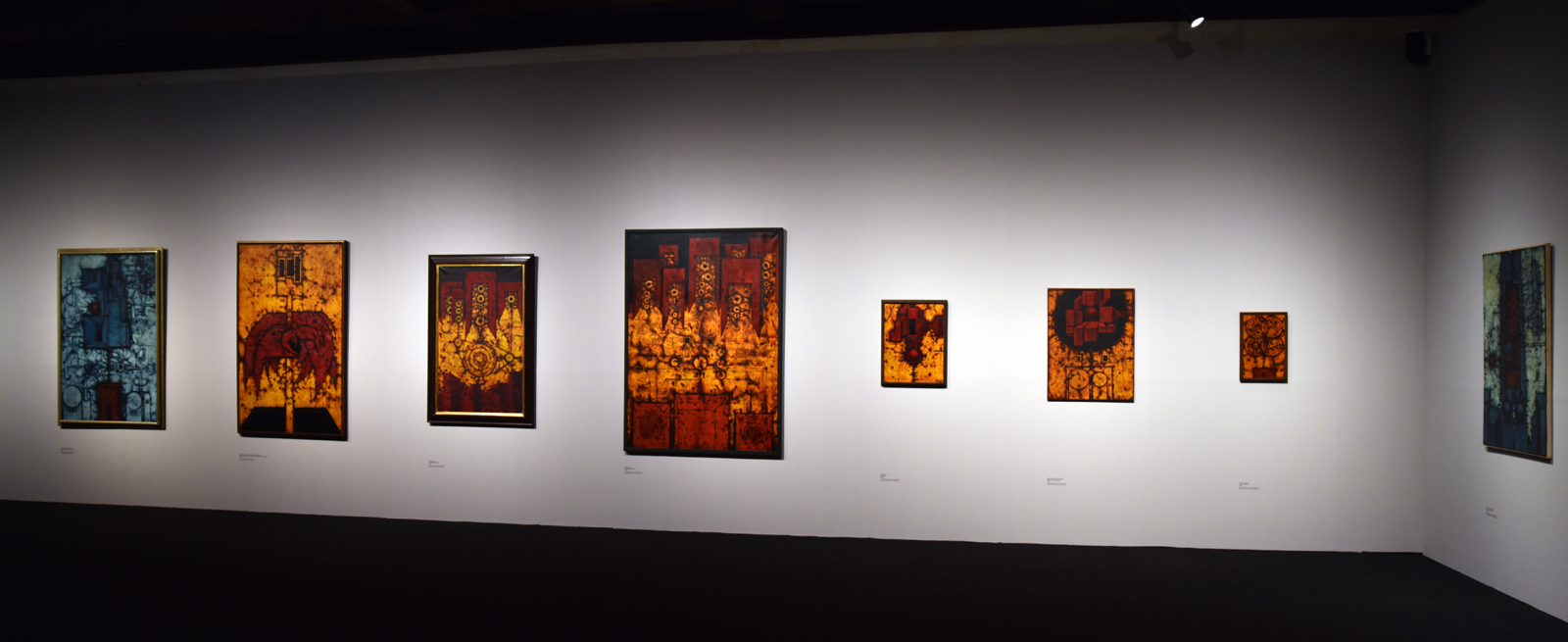
Mikuláš Medek: Naked in Thorns, Wallenstein Riding Hall (2019) X

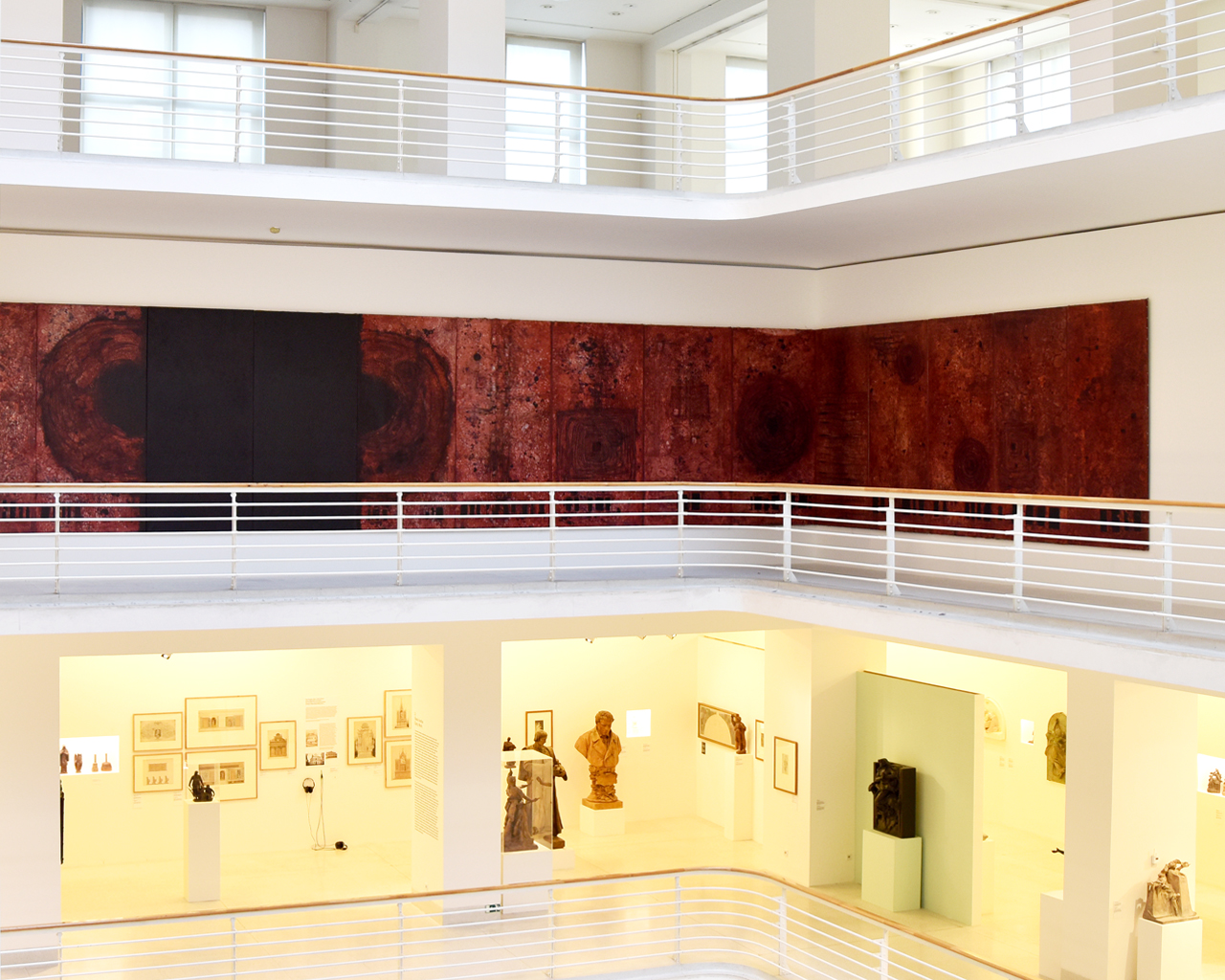
Mikuláš Medek, 14-piece wall panel for Košice Airport (1964)

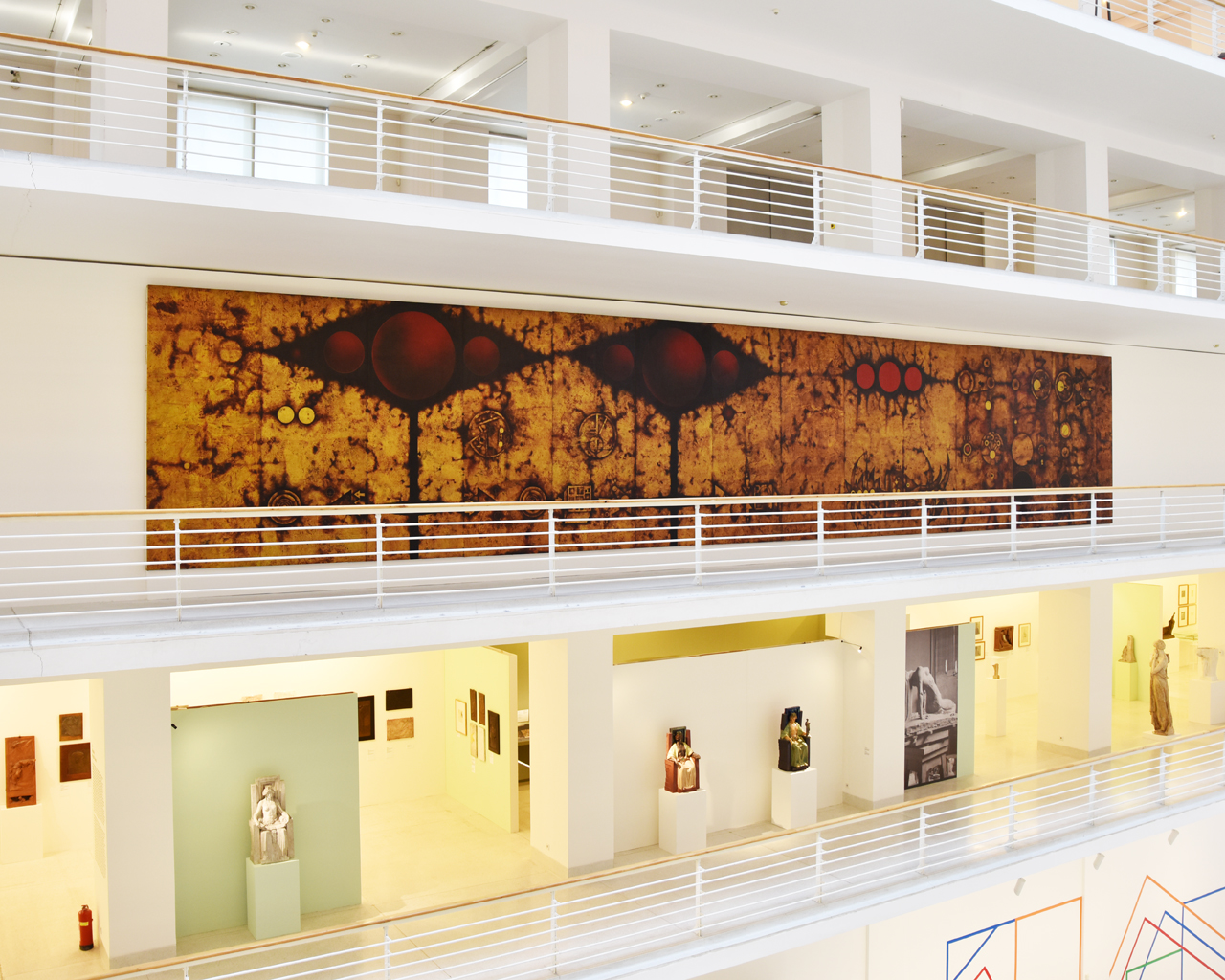
Mikuláš Medek, Signals, for Prague Ruzyně Airport (1969)

== Sources ==
- Mirek Vodrážka, Fine Art and its Subversive Role in the Normalization Period, Centre for Documentation of Totalitarian Regimes, Prague 2019, ISBN 978-80-270-5668-2
- Iveta Zenklová, Reflection on the informal art of painter Mikuláš Medek in contemporary and later literature, Bachelor thesis, ÚDU FF UK Prague 2014
- Mikuláš Medek, a closed problem or a current phenomenon of Czech art? Proceedings of the Scientific Research Institute of the Academy of Fine Arts, Prague, 2002
- Jiří Ševčík, Pavlína Morganová, Dagmar Dušková Svatošová, Czech Art 1938–1989, 520 p., Academia, Prague 2001, ISBN 80-200-0930-2
- Vogelová, Pavlína: Mikuláš Medek and Emila Medková: Shadows of paintings, texts and photographs, In: Proceedings of the National Museum in Prague. Series A - History. Vol. 70, No. 1-2, 2016, pp. 53–64
- Ryszard Stanisławski, Christoph Brockhaus, Europa, Europa: Das Jahrhundert der Avantgarde in Mittel- und Osteuropa, 351 p., Kunst- und Ausstellungshalle der Bundesrepublik Deutschland (Bundeskunsthalle), Bonn 1994
- Petr Král, Le surréalisme en Tchécoslovaquie, 359 p., Gallimard, Paris 1983, ISBN 2-07-021692-6
- Hommage à Mikuláš Medek, anthology 66 p., Paris-Tökendorf-Wien 1976
- Surrealist starting point 1938–1968, 290 p., Čs. spisovatel, Prague 1969

=== Monographs ===
- Bohumír Mráz, Medek, 178 p., publisher: Obelisk, Prague 1970
- Mikuláš Medek - Texts, 1995, 436 p., Torst, Prague, ISBN 80-85639-56-4
- Antonín Hartmann, Mikuláš Medek, 211 p., Gema Art Group, Prague 2002 ISBN 80-86087-34-4

=== Catalogues ===
- Mikuláš Medek: Selection of paintings from 1947 to 1965, Antonín Hartmann, Bohumír Mráz, 40 p., SČSVU Prague 1965
- Mikuláš Medek: Paintings 1961–1966, Antonín Hartmann, Bohumír Mráz, 7 p., Unified Racing Club ROH, Ústí nad Orlicí 1966
- Mikuláš Medek: Twenty unpublished paintings from 1960/65, Čestmír Krátký, 24 p., Regional Gallery Liberec 1966
- Mikulás Medek, Antonín Hartmann, Silvio Ceccato, Germano Beringheli, 56 p., Galleria La Bertesca, Genoa 1967
- Mikuláš Medek: Peintures, Paintings, Bilder 1958 - 1967, Antonín Hartmann, 52 p., Art Cenrum, Prague 1968
- Mikuláš Medek: Designers of Towers, Libor Fára, Bohumír Mráz, 12 p., SČSVU Prague 1969
- Mikuláš Medek: Drawings and Illustrations, 4 p., 1st exhibition Faces 1969
- Mikuláš Medek: Paintings 1944 - 1969, Bohumír Mráz, 48 p., Art Centrum, Regional Gallery, Hradec Králové 1969
- Mikuláš Medek, 6 p., Ausstellung Regensburg, Museum d. Stadt 1969
- Mikuláš Medek Prag, Im Kunstkreis Leinfelden, Christoph Wilhelmi, 8 p., Leinfelden-Echterdingen 1970
- Mikuláš Medek: Exhibition of paintings, 1 sheet, Exhibition of paintings by Mikuláš Medek in his studio in Prague 7, Letohradská 5, 20–22 September 1975
- Mikuláš Medek 1926 - 1974, Jan Koblasa, Mikuláš Medek, Bohumír Mráz, Petr Spielmann, Milan Nápravník, 32 p., Museum Bochum 1976, ISBN 3-8093-0027-6
- Mikuláš Medek: Selected Paintings from 1944/1974, Hartmann Antonín et al., 1988, exhibition catalogue, 52 p., GMU Roudnice nad Labem; 1990 House of Art Brno
- Mikuláš Medek: Paintings, Selected works, Berinhelli G et al., 1990, cat. 86 sheets, OGVU Olomouc
- Mikuláš Medek: Paintings (Selected works), Jan Koblasa et al., 77 + 9 pp., Alšova jihočeská galerie v Hluboká nad Vltavou 1990
- Mikuláš Medek: Paintings 1942–1974, Effenberger Vratislav et al., cat. 60 p., DU of Brno 1990
- Mikuláš Medek: ČSA Košice 1963–64, Karel Srp, 48 p., Dvorak Sec Contemporary (DSC Gallery), Prague 2012
- Mikuláš Medek: Moving Graves, Karel Srp, Věra Linhartová, Josef Topol, 59 p., Galerie Zdeněk Sklenář, Prague 2014, ISBN 978-80-87430-42-2
- Mikuláš Medek: Naked in Thorns, Karel Srp, Lenka Bydžovská (eds.), 204 p., National Gallery in Prague 2020, ISBN 978-80-7035-761-3
