= Fairmont Golden Prague Hotel =

Hotel in Prague, Czech

Fairmont Golden Prague
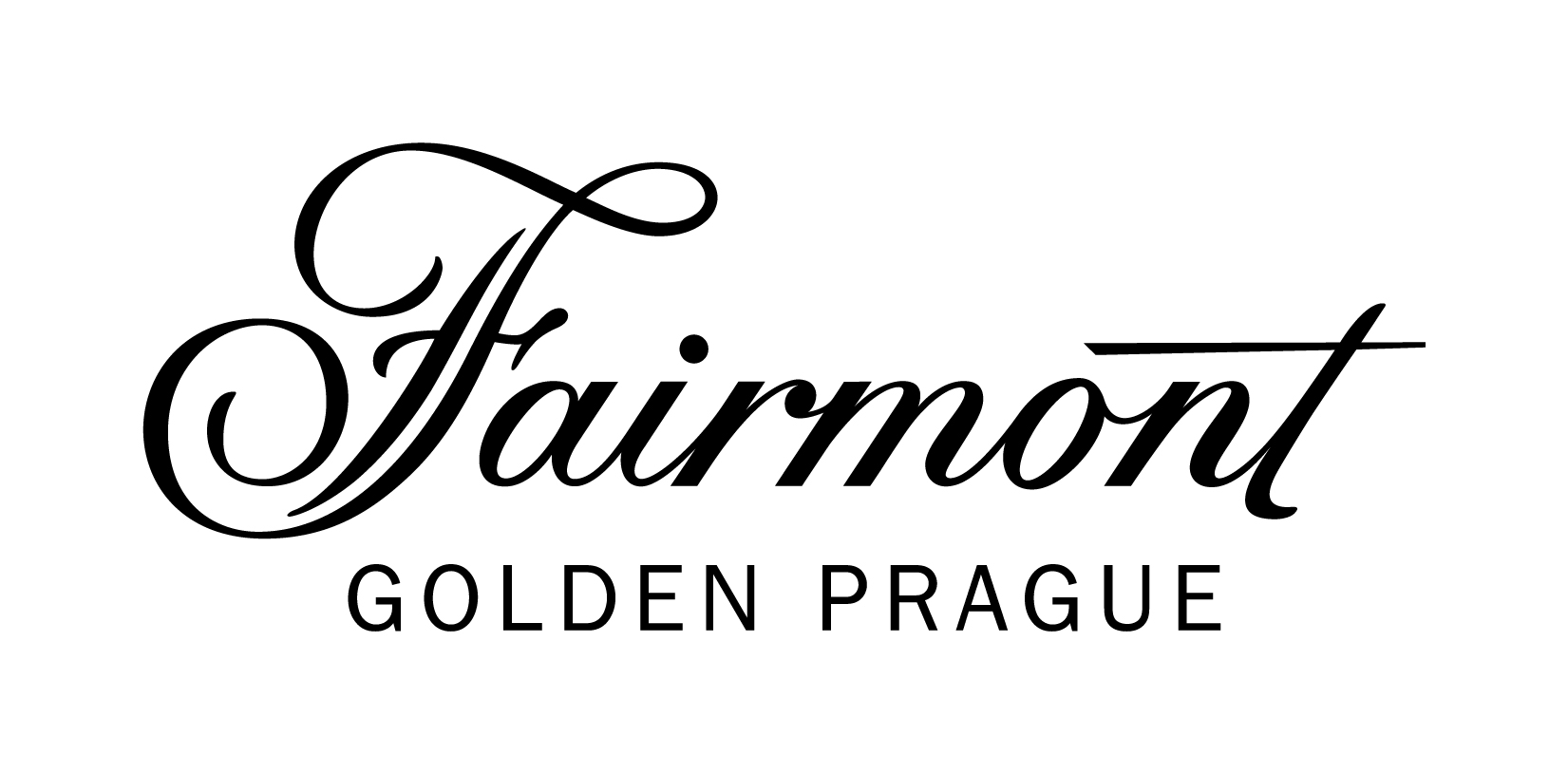

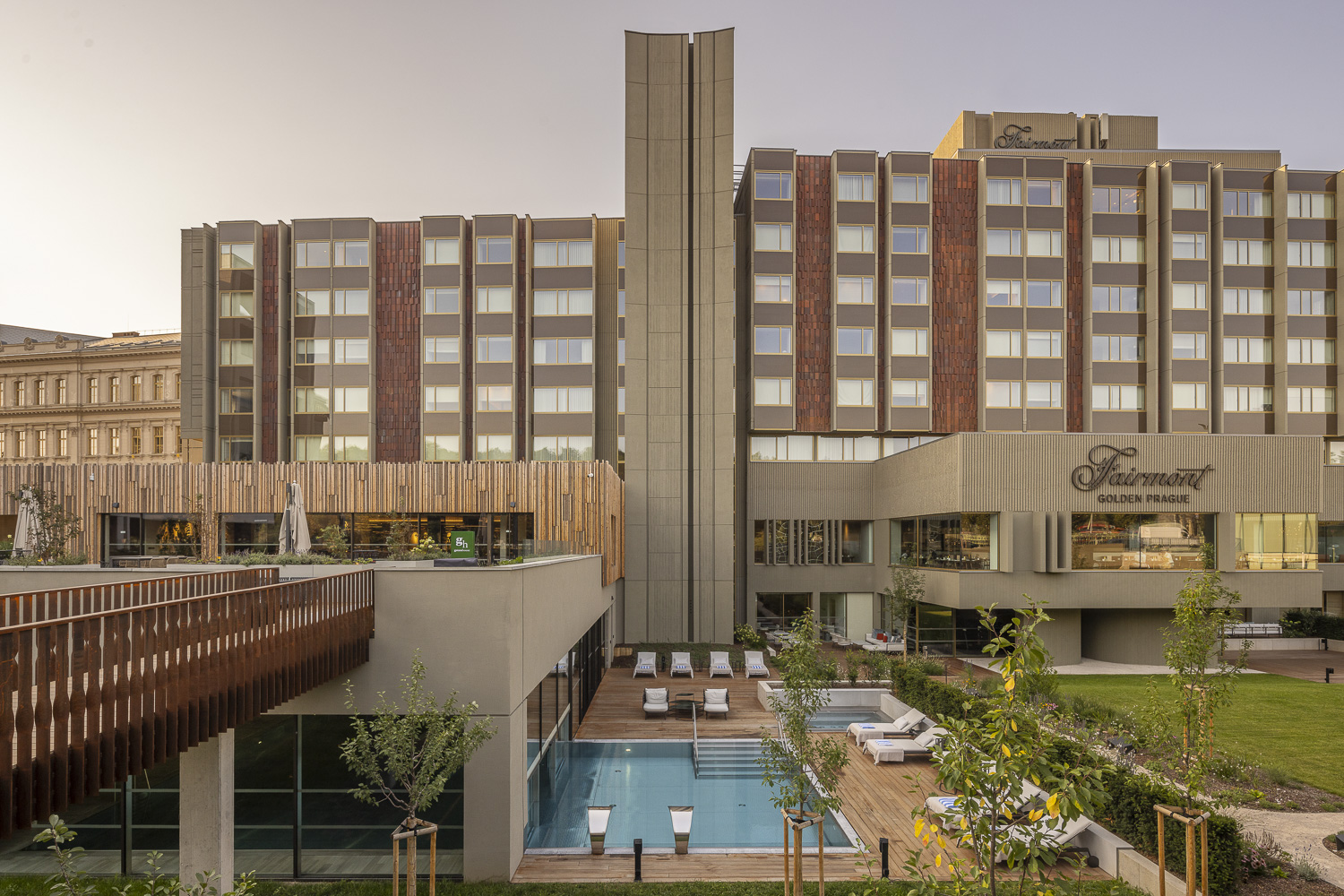

General information
- Location: Pařížská 30; Prague, Czech Republic, 110 00
- Coordinates: 50°5′28.95″N 14°25′6.17″E
- Opening: Original - December 7, 1974; Reopening - April 15, 2025
- Owner: R2G Heritage
- Operator: Fairmont Hotels

Technical details
- Floor count: 9

Design and construction
- Architect: Marek Tichý
- Developer: ČEDOK

Other information
- Number of rooms: 320

Website
- https://www.fairmont.com/prague/

The Fairmont Golden Prague, formerly the InterContinental Prague, is a historic luxury hotel and Brutalist building in Prague, Czech Republic. Designed by Czech architect Karel Filsak and built between 1968 and 1974, it stands on the Vltava riverfront at the northern end of Pařížská Street.

The building underwent an extensive reconstruction between 2021 and 2025 and reopened on 15 April 2025 as the Fairmont Golden Prague, operated by Fairmont Hotels and Resorts. The nine-storey building comprises 320 rooms, suites and serviced residences.

== History ==
The Inter-Continental Praha was built between 1968 and 1974 in the Brutalist style to designs by a team led by Czech architect Karel Filsak. The project was developed by the state travel agency ČEDOK in cooperation with Intercontinental Hotels Corporation and became the first international five-star hotel in Czechoslovakia. Its architecture, interiors and artworks were conceived as an integrated whole, with the interiors designed by teams led by Jan Šrámek and František Cubr. Trial operation began in August 1974, and the hotel officially opened on 7 December 1974.

Following the fall of communism, the hotel passed into the ownership of Czech banks during the privatization process. It underwent substantial renovations between 1992 and 1995, in which architect Roman Koucký participated. By 1999, more than 90 percent of the hotel was held by Komerční banka, Česká spořitelna and Živnostenská banka. Later that year, it was acquired by Strategic Hotel Capital, the predecessor of Strategic Hotels & Resorts.

Strategic Hotels & Resorts sold the hotel in 2010. In 2013, Slovak hotel company Best Hotel Properties acquired a 90 percent stake in the property. In January 2019, the hotel was acquired through R2G Heritage by Czech businessmen Oldřich Šlemr, Pavel Baudiš and Eduard Kučera.

The hotel joined the Fairmont Hotels and Resorts portfolio in May 2020 and subsequently closed for an extensive reconstruction. Work began in autumn 2020 and involved stripping much of the building back to its concrete structure and addressing significant structural problems.

The reconstruction was led by architect Marek Tichý of TaK Architects and sought to restore elements of Filsak's original design that had been obscured by later alterations. Exposed concrete, the ceramic façade and significant works of Czech post-war art were restored. The hotel reopened on 15 April 2025 as the Fairmont Golden Prague.

In November 2025, Baudiš became the majority owner of the company that owns the hotel, increasing his stake to 70%. Kučera retained the remaining 30%, while Šlemr left the ownership structure.

== Architecture and art ==
Art was conceived as an integral part of the hotel's original architecture and interiors. Among the contributors were several prominent figures in post-war Czech art. Sculptor Zbyněk Sekal designed the ceramic elements of the façades, while René Roubíček, a leading figure in modern Czech glass art, created the glass lighting for the conference hall.

Sculptor Hugo Demartini designed gilded light fixtures, and Stanislav Libenský and Jaroslava Brychtová, whose work was influential in the development of monumental glass sculpture, created architectural glass works for the hotel.

The reconstruction also introduced new site-specific works by contemporary Czech artists. These include a series of glass sculptures by Zdeněk Lhotský, whose work continues the Czech monumental-glass tradition associated with Libenský and Brychtová.

== Gallery ==
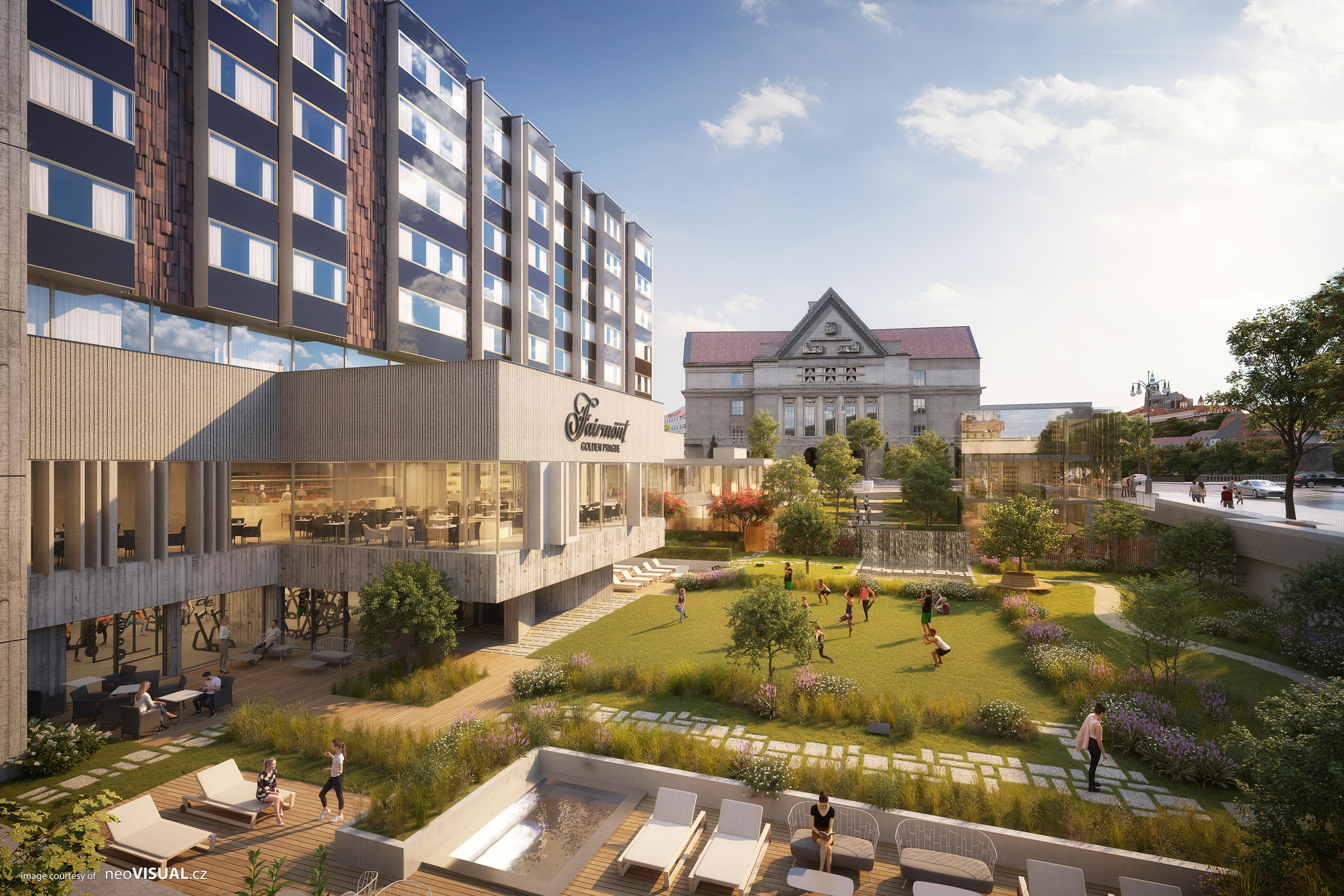
Rendering of the renovated garden, showing raw concrete architectural elements of the hotel

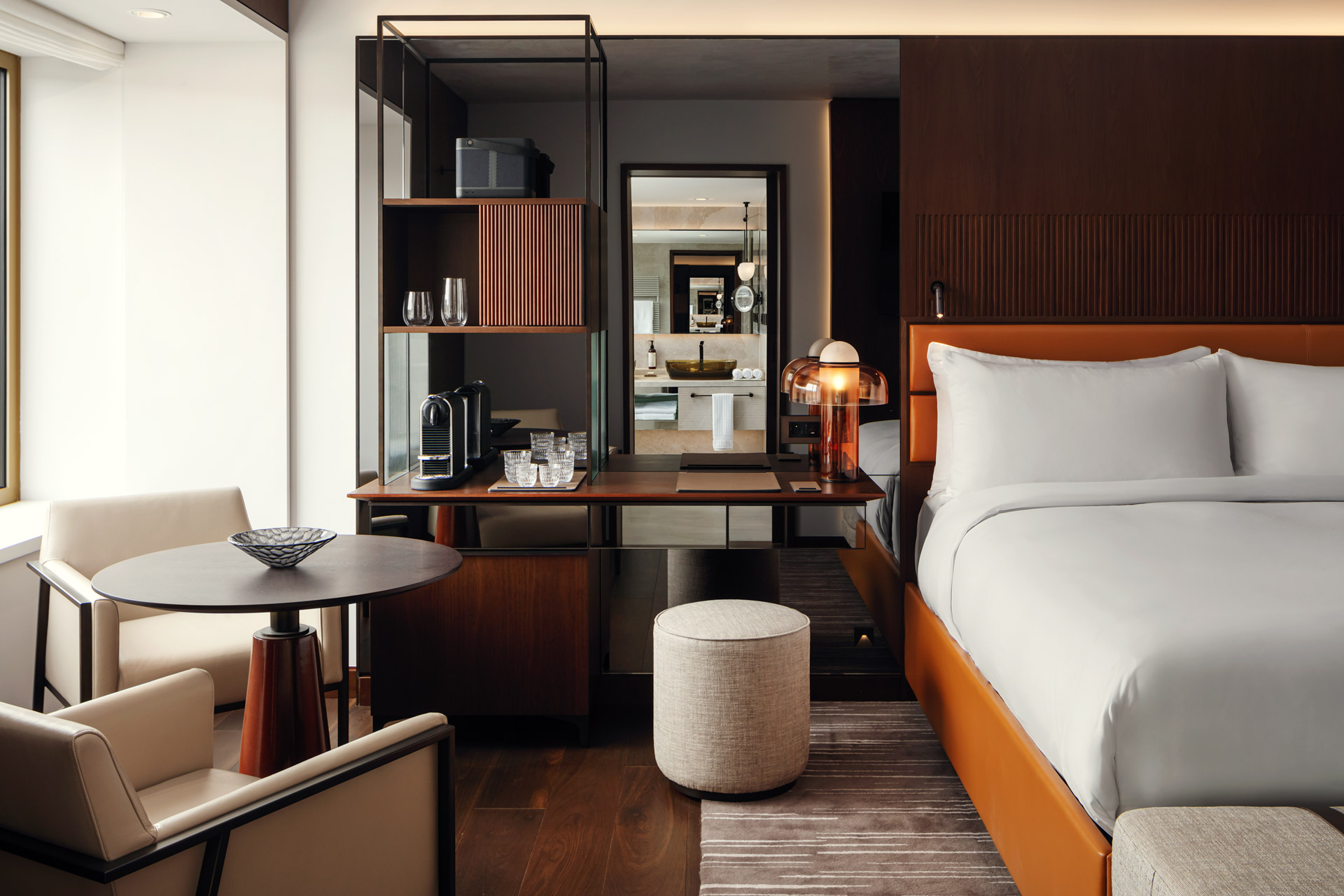
Fairmont Signature Room

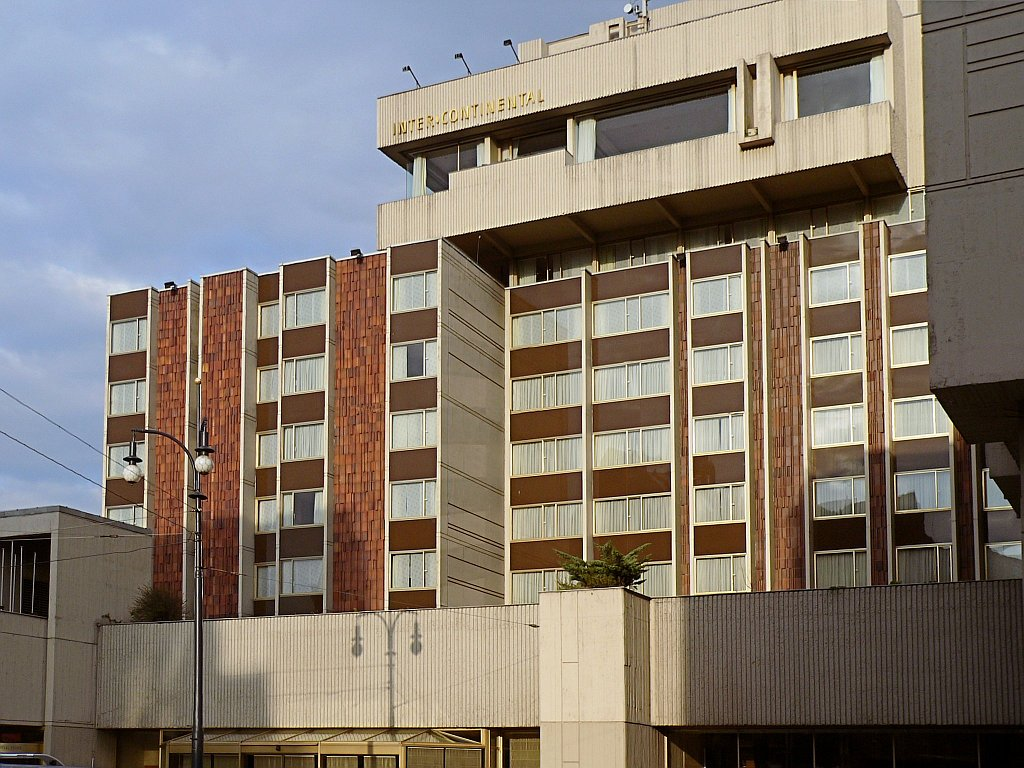
Typical elements of the architecture of the hotel - raw concrete, solid rectangular, 2007

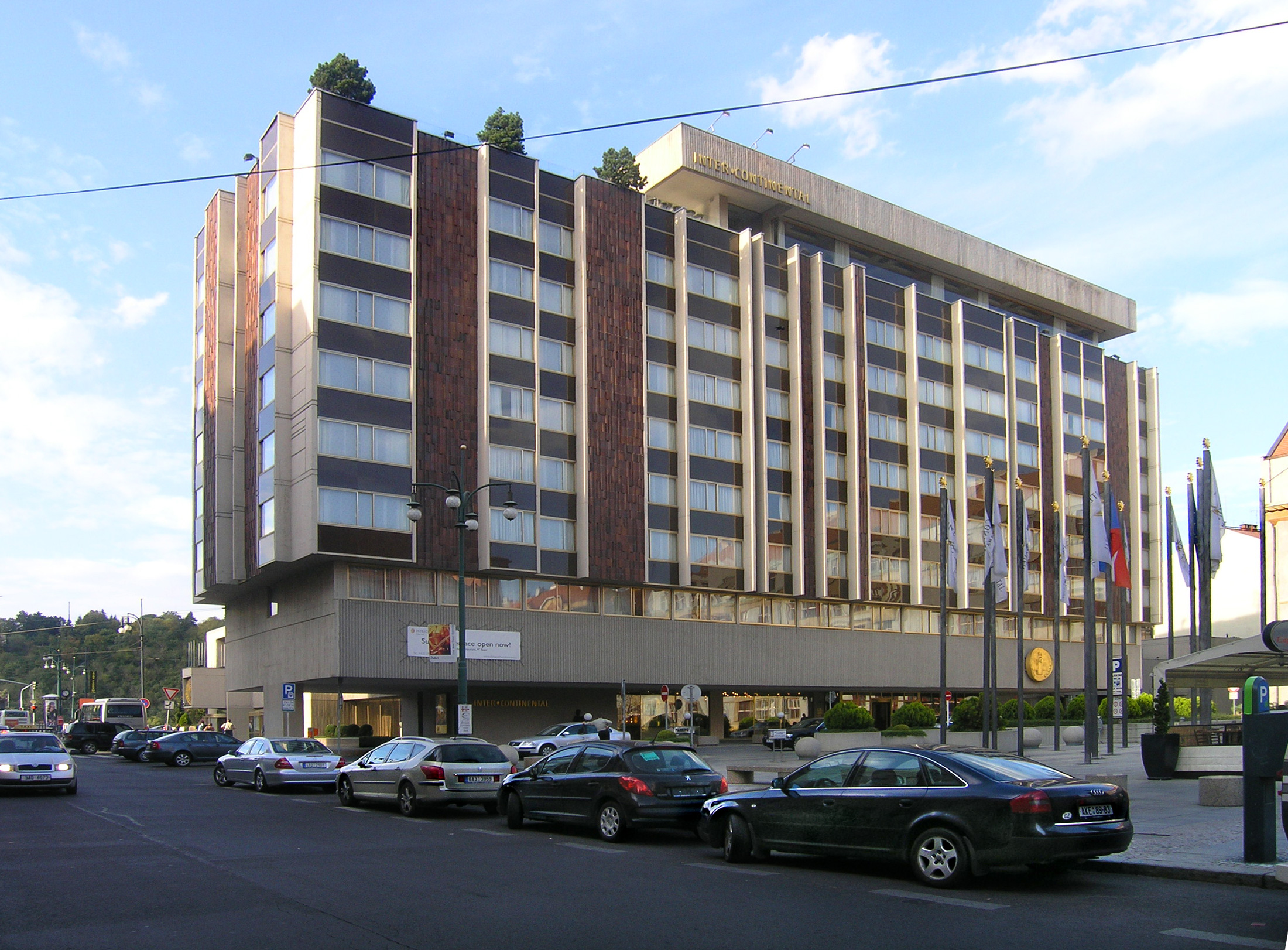
Facade of the hotel, 2007

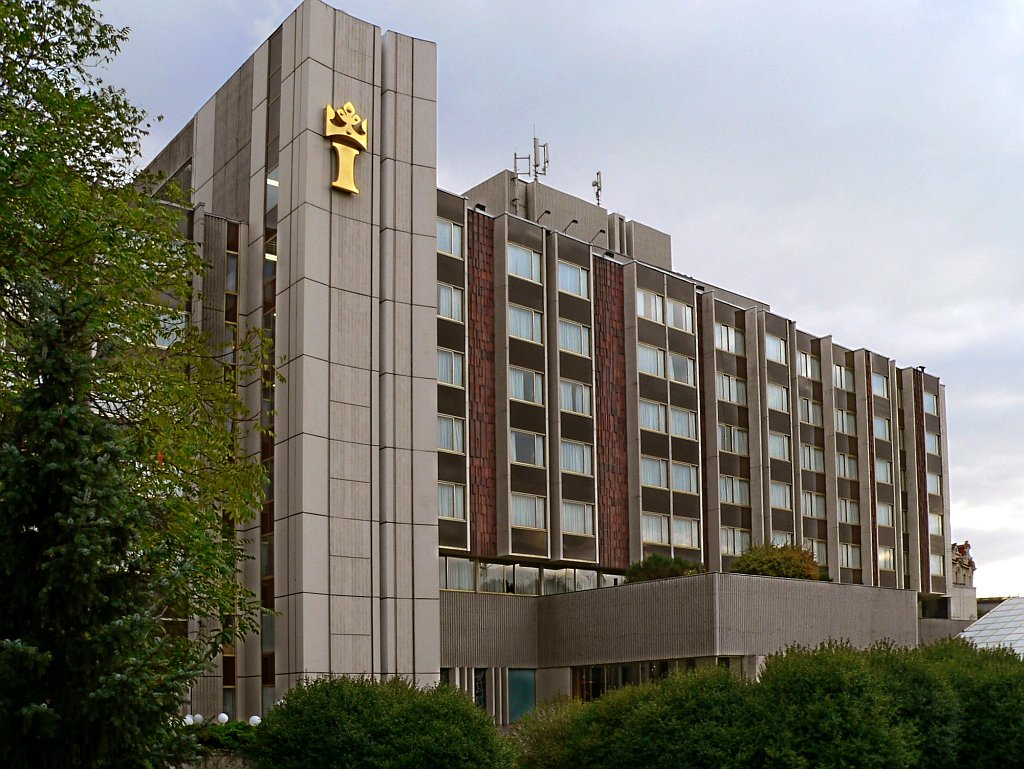
View from gardens, 2007

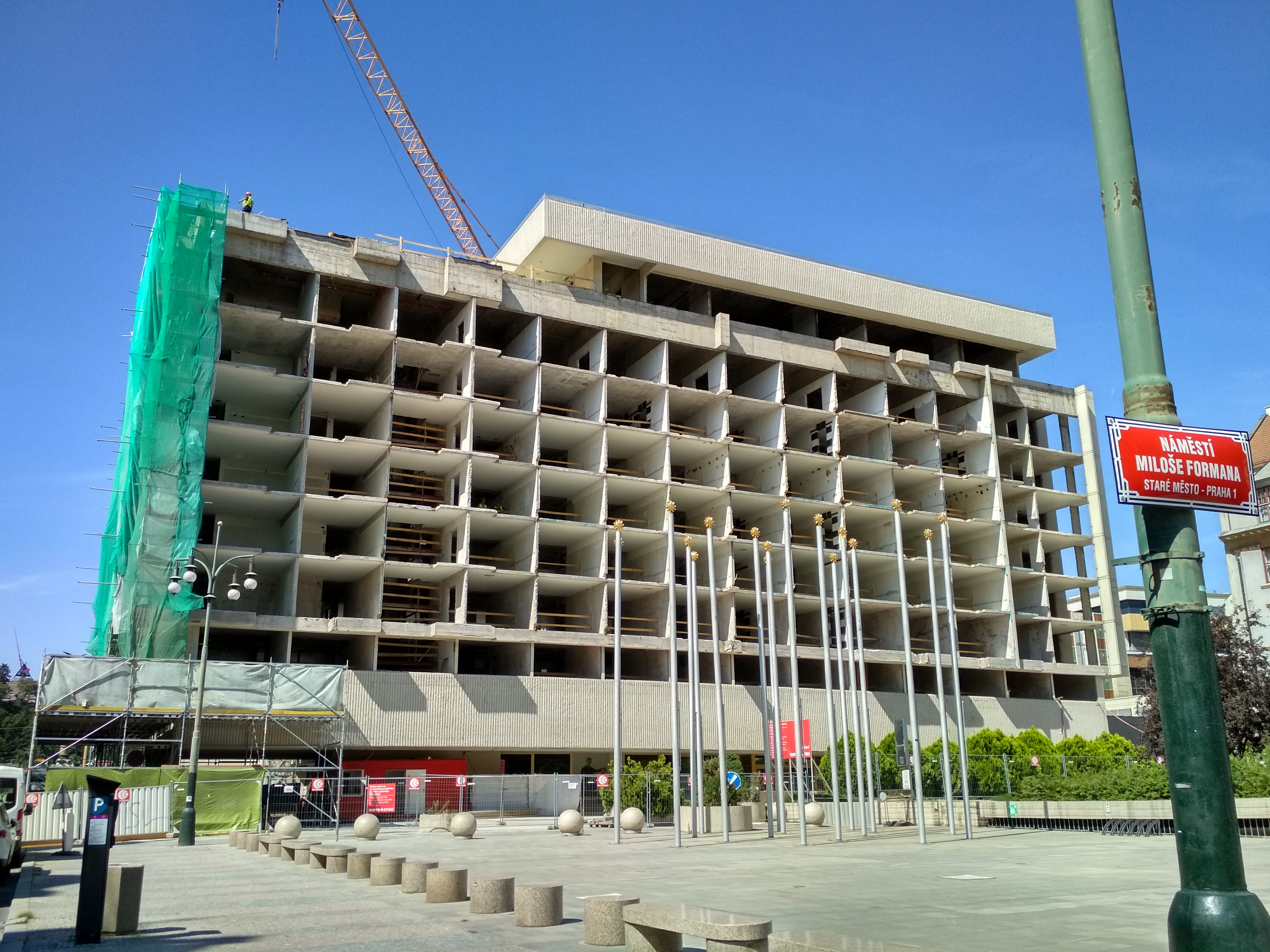
The structure in 2021, during renovations, stripped to its concrete shell
