= Zbyněk Sekal =

Czech painter and sculptor (1923–1998)

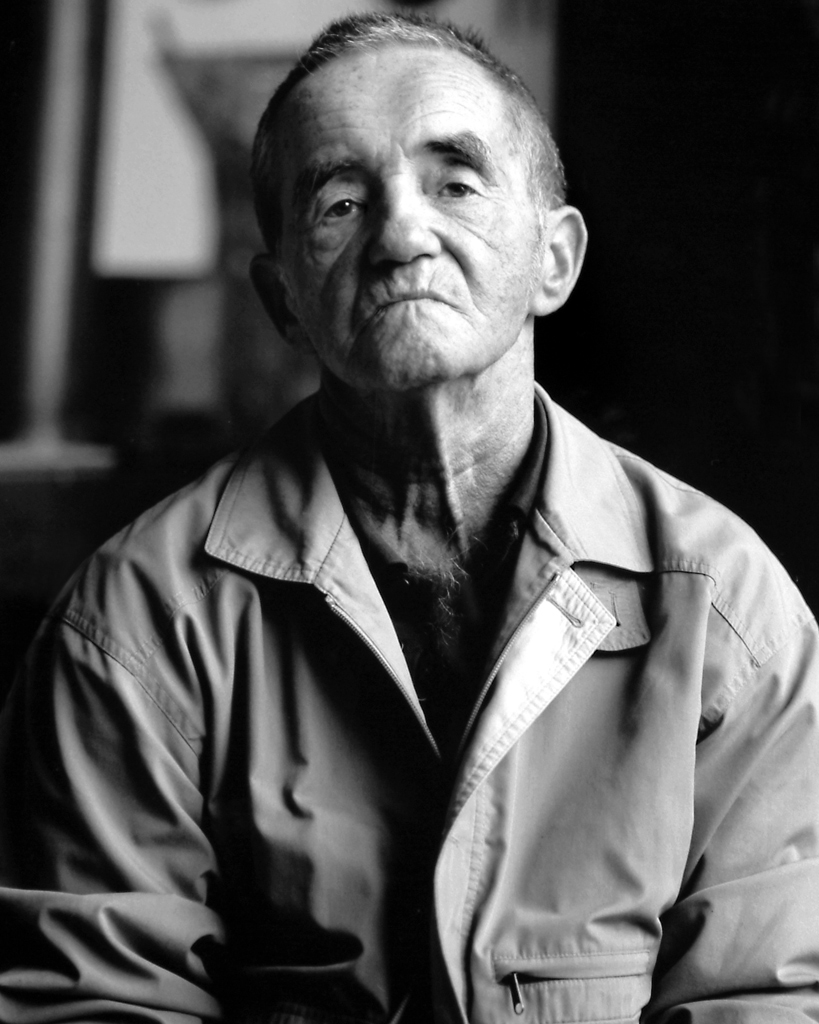
- Zbyněk Sekal (1994), portrait by Eva Choung-Fux
- Born: 12 July 1923; Prague, Czechoslovakia
- Died: 24 February 1998 (aged 74); Vienna, Austria
- Education: Academy of Arts, Architecture and Design in Prague
- Known for: sculpture, objects, assemblage, painting, typography, translations
- Awards: City of Vienna Prize for Sculpture (1984)

Zbyněk Sekal (12 July 1923 – 24 February 1998) was a Czech sculptor, painter and translator. During World War II he was imprisoned for three years in the Mauthausen concentration camp. After the Warsaw Pact invasion of Czechoslovakia in August 1968, he emigrated to Austria. Already in the mid-1960s, he was considered one of the most important and distinctive Czech sculptors.

== Life ==
=== 1923–1968 ===
In 1934–1941 he graduated from the Real Gymnasium and the Business Academy and then worked briefly as an intern at the Topič publishing house. Before the war, he was already involved in the activities of the Comité de la democratie de España and later worked in the left-wing anti-Nazi National Movement of Working Youth. At the beginning of the war, he lost his father. In 1941, at the age of eighteen, he was arrested for distributing leaflets, imprisoned in Pankrác Prison in Prague, in the Small Fortress in Terezín, and for the next three years until the end of the war in Mauthausen concentration camp, where he worked for a year in a stone quarry. In the concentration camp, he became close to the Polish painter Marian Bogusz, and later, as a scribe in an office, he perfected his German, from which he later translated very difficult philosophical texts.

In 1945, he was accepted to study at the Academy of Arts, Architecture and Design in Prague in the studio of prof. František Tichý and made friends with his classmates Mikuláš Medek, Stanislav Podhrázský, Josef Lehoučka and Zdeněk Palcr. He rejoined the Spořilov Surrealist group, which had been formed by his friends of the same generation at the beginning of the war. On a trip to Paris organized for students in 1947 by prof. Václav Nebeský, he visited the International Surrealism Exhibition at the Galerie Maeght several times. He was strongly impressed by the rawness of the installations with reminiscences of war and camps and the primitivizing paintings (in the Foyer de l'Art Brut ) by Jean Dubuffet. He also made the acquaintance of Toyen, who was preparing paintings for an exhibition in Prague at Topič Salon. Shortly before his trip to Paris, at the age of 24, he married the painter Ludmila Purkyňová, with whom he had a son, Jan.

He continued his studies at the Academy of Arts, Architecture and Design in Prague under prof. František Muzika and in the studio of prof. Emil Filla, but in 1950 he left the school without a diploma to avoid politicized state exams. After leaving school, he belonged to the so-called Libeň circle of Bohumil Hrabal and was the author of the generational statement "Postscript or Abdication" (1951), which was first published in samizdat as part of Hrabal's book The Tender Barbarian (Petlice edition).

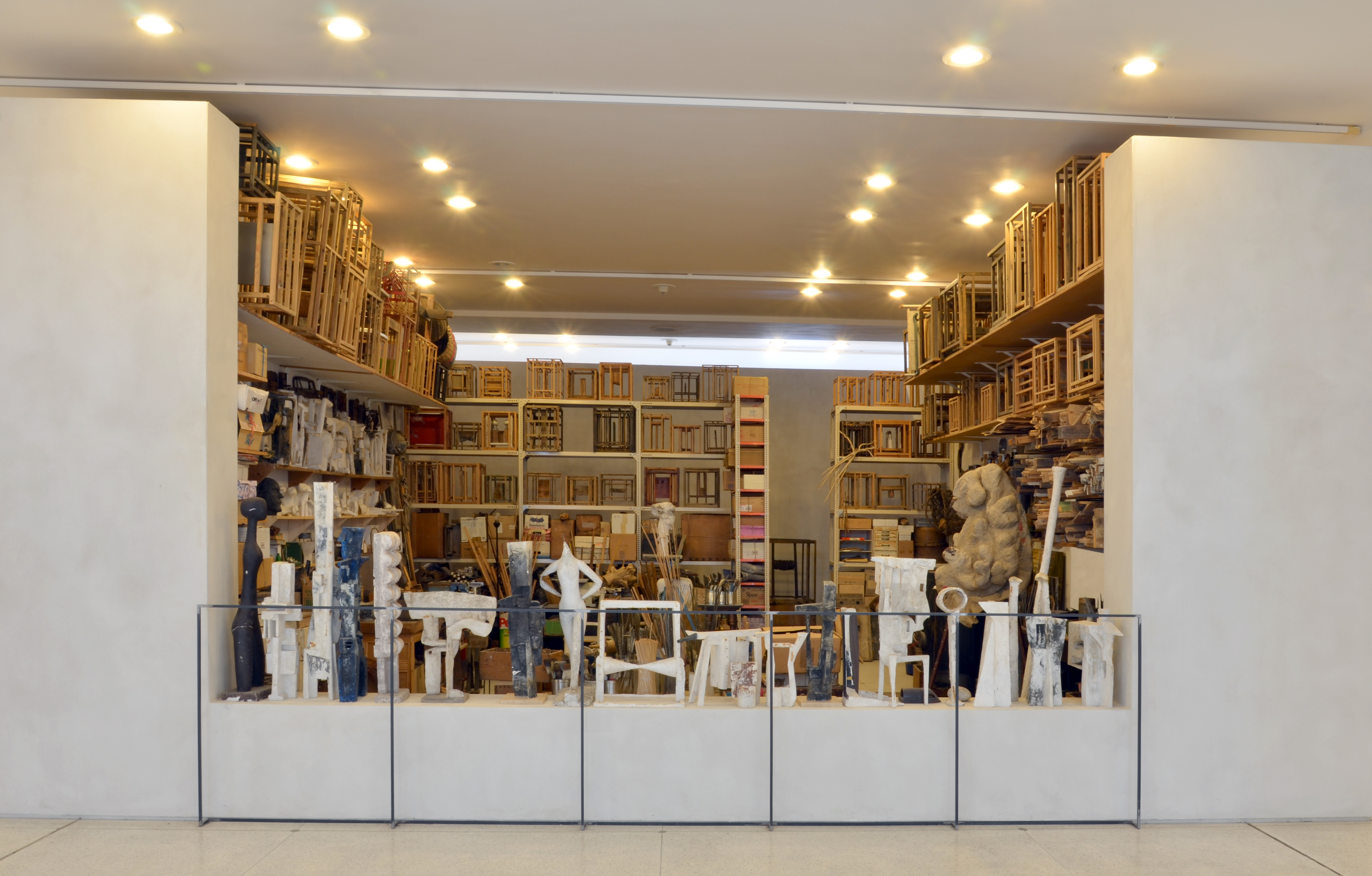
Zbyněk Sekal, reconstructed studio, National Gallery Prague, Trade Fair Palace

In 1951–1953 he was employed as a publicity officer at the General Directorate of Meat Industry and as a literary editor at the Political Literature Publishing House (later Svoboda publishing house). In the winter of 1952/1953 he completed his military service. In a futile attempt to save his broken marriage, he moved to Bratislava to join his wife, and in the following years until 1958 lived there alone, working as a translator from German and an art editor. However, he maintained written and personal contact with Prague friends (Mikuláš Medek, Egon Bondy) and sent them manuscripts of his translations. At that time, he was interested in Russian pre-revolutionary thinkers (Berdyaev, Shestov) and especially in existentialism and phenomenology (Nietzsche, Husserl, Schopenhauer, Freud, Jaspers, Heidegger), Franz Kafka, Hermann Hesse and Ludwig Feuerbach. He was invited as a guest to the first exhibition of Group Máj in 1957, participated in the second exhibition in 1958 as a member and returned to Prague. Sekal joined Group Máj because of his friends, but he did not identify with the group's program. In the 1950s, under the influence of reading, he felt an "inner emigration", remained a solitaire in his work, and long before the August 1968 occupation, he was already thinking of leaving for Austria.

The following year he travels to Moscow and Leningrad (1959) and in 1961, with sculptors Zdeněk Palcr and Miloslav Hájek, to Warsaw and Gdańsk. A classmate of Zdeněk Palcr from prof. Wagner's studio at VŠUP Alina Szapocznikow introduced him to the sculptor Barbara Pniewska, whose material work was the inspiration for the first of his assemblages, which he called Assembled Pictures. In the early 1960s he was close to Informel and was one of the initiators of the Imaginative and Structural Abstraction movement, but he differed in his strictly intellectual approach to his work. In 1961 he married for the second time to Helena Waldvogel, with whom he had a son, Ondrej.

From 1961 he had his own studio on Bělohorská Street in Břevnov and in 1965 he had his first solo exhibitions in Václav Špála Gallery in Prague and House of the Lords of Kunštát in Brno. In 1966 he visited East Berlin and Dresden. In Germany, he made friendly contacts that enabled him, after emigrating, to take advantage of a DAAD scholarship offered by the Akademie der Künste and to acquire a small studio in Berlin.

In the 1960s he participated in sculpture symposia in Gmunden (1964, 1965), St. Margarethen (1966) and Vyšné Ružbachy (1967). Even when chiselling the stone, he did not abandon the basic principle of connection with memory, and arrived at an organic shape that was reminiscent of the sandstone rocks in the Děčín region that he knew from his childhood.

=== 1968–1998 ===
After the Warsaw Pact invasion of Czechoslovakia, he emigrated first to Berlin, then to Düsseldorf and in 1970 finally settled permanently in Vienna. He had to leave behind several dozen sculptures in Prague, only some of which could be brought to Vienna by his son, who was forced to emigrate by the StB in 1983.

From 1972 to 1974 he taught at the Staatliche Akademie der Bildenden Künste in Stuttgart. After his emigration he experienced a creative crisis, he missed his partner, who remained in Czechoslovakia, and the role of teacher was alien to his introvert nature. In Vienna he married Christine Pulitzer. From 1974 to the early 1980s he was a member of the Wiener Secession. During the winter of 1980–1981, he spent a study stay in Amsterdam at the invitation of the Stedelijk Museum. In 1984 he received the City of Vienna Prize for Sculpture. In 1995 the National Gallery returned to Zbyněk Sekal the works held in Prague after his emigration throughout the period of normalisation until the fall of communism.

After 1989, his works were exhibited successively in Brno, Opava, Bratislava (1992–1993) and in a large retrospective exhibition at the Prague City Gallery in 1997. The National Gallery in Prague in the Trade Fair Palace reconstructed Sekal's Vienna studio in 2014 and is exhibiting it in a permanent exhibition together with a large body of Sekal's sculptures. The architectural design was created by the MCA studio of architects Miroslav Cikán and Pavla Melková. The exhibition was curated by Marie Klimešová.

Sekal found a deep resonance with his work in Japan, which he visited twice in the last decade of his life (1989 and 1997). In July 1996, during the preparations for the Prague exhibition, he fell seriously ill and had to undergo lung surgery. He died in Vienna on 24 February 1998.

== Awards ==
- 1984 City of Vienna Prize for Sculpture

== Work ==
Sekal's first drawings influenced by Cubism and Expressionism were made in 1940–1941 and during his imprisonment during the war. His contact with Lubomír Vašátko, (Note: Lubomír Vašátko, born 5 September 1919 in Jihlava - 1942 Mauthausen, was a pharmaceutical aspirant and surrealist painter, active before the war in the student association Youth Culture.) who later perished in the Mauthausen concentration camp, was important. During his studies in 1945–1950 he was interested in figuration, but his experiments with the non-traditional techniques of surrealists, especially collages and frottage, foreshadowed his later interest in material creation. His sculptural work ranges between modelling and object and is based on the transformed principles of cubist sculpture. Fritz Wotruba was close to him artistically.

Sekal maintained a close friendship with Mikuláš Medek, and in cycles of drawings, often self-portraits questioning his own personality (The Man Who Smokes), he tried different variations from the veristic to the expressive and imaginative. His photographs of his wife's Face with Surrealist Installations (1947) and his photographic montages anticipated the later similar work of Emila Medková in 1949. At this time, he also assembled surrealist objects and made several book cover designs for titles by Breton, Kafka, and Meyrink. One of the earliest motifs of his postwar drawings is The Lamentation of the Hanged Man, followed by still lifes, drawings of birds, caricatured drawings of soldiers in uniform, and finally a cold, detached reminiscence of war (The Unknown General, 1959).

Sekal's first sculptural works are studies of heads and busts in patinated plaster (Head of a Girl, 1957, Bust, 1957), on which he tests simplified modelling. In the context of Czech sculpture of the 1950s, his Head with Closed Eyes (1955) is exceptional; it is a stylized self-portrait and does not depict sleep but an inward-looking gaze. It coincides with the break-up with his first wife Ludmila. Autobiographical tendencies in Sekal's work are also manifested in self-reflection through diary entries. He was conceptually close to Paul Klee and his "Portrait of a Man Experiencing the Inner World" and understanding art not as a "representation of the visible" but as "making visible in a more esoteric sense."

In the late 1950s, Sekal created several intimate sculptures in which he deals with post-Cubist (Centaur and Lady, 1956) and imaginative inspirations (Bearing Figure, 1957). The sculpture Boy Blue Flower (1957) refers to Novalis's novel and in the context of Czech sculpture of the 1950s it represents an extraordinary act in its radicality and independence from any models. The existential symbols are drawings and sculptures of birds (Bird, 1957), but especially two suggestive sculptures evoking the suffering of war (Screaming Head, Dead Head, both from 1957).

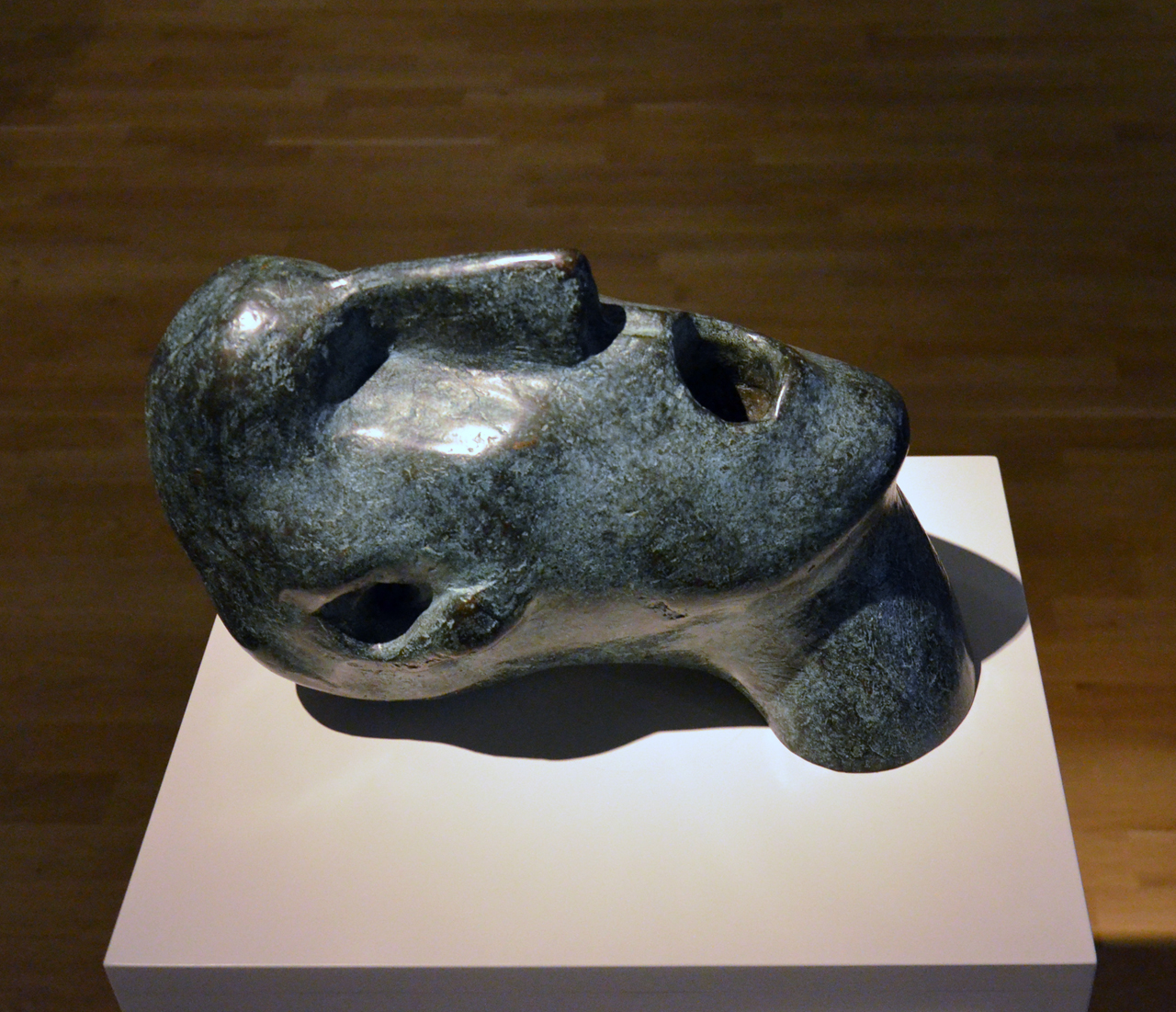
Dead Head, 1957, bronze, Museum of Art Olomouc

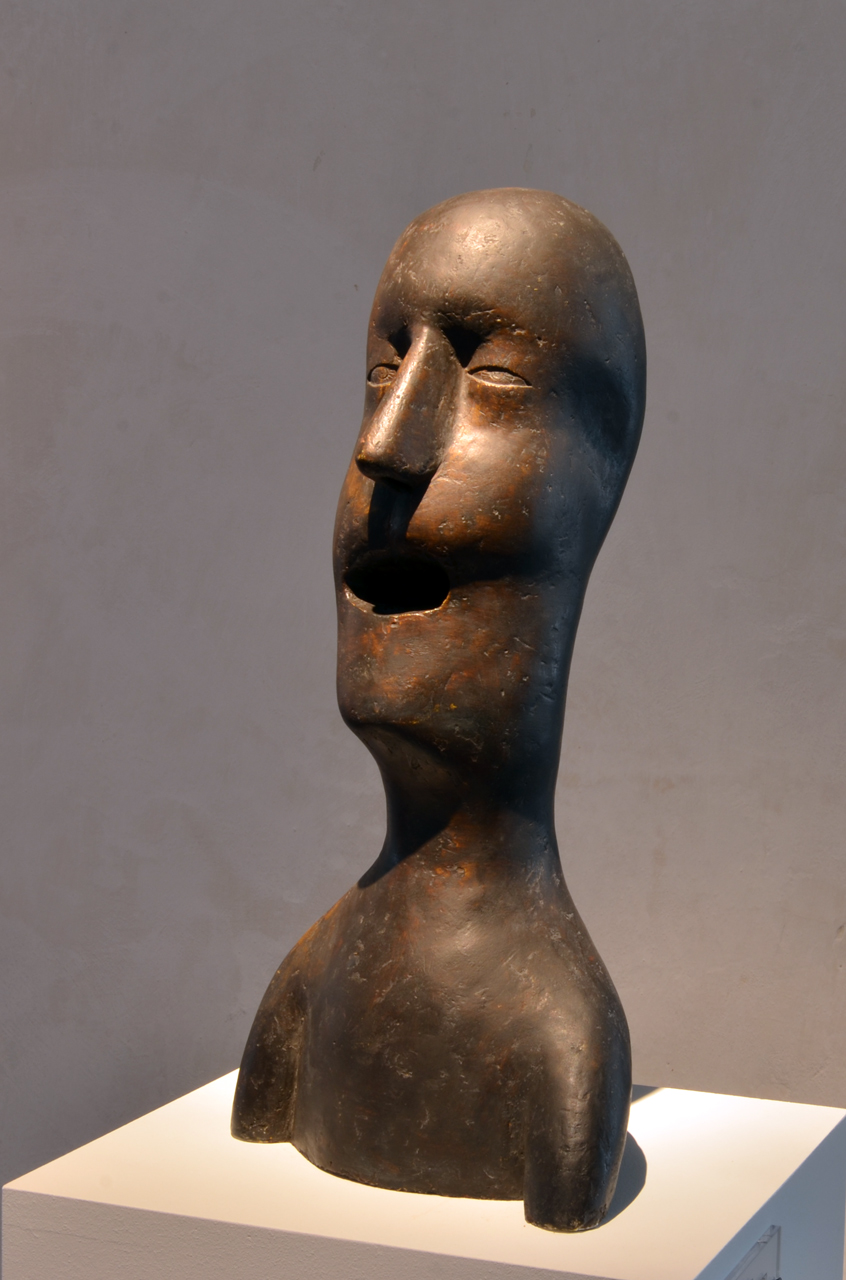
Screaming Head, 1957, patinated plaster, GASK Kutná Hora

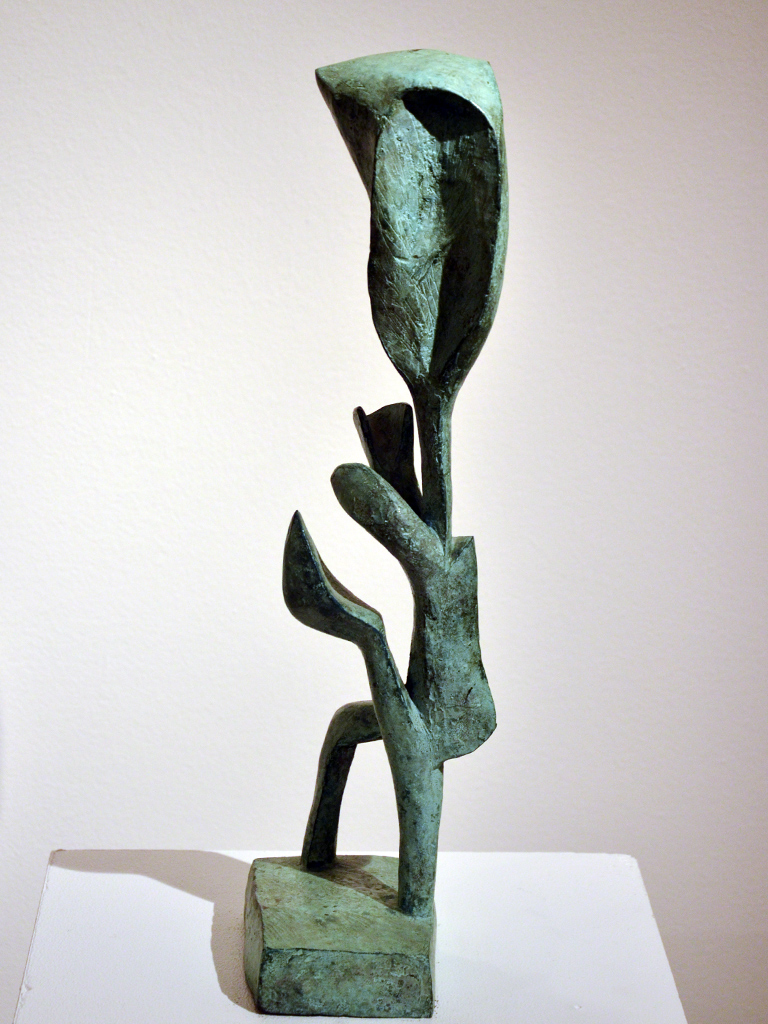
Boy Blue Flower, 1957, private collection

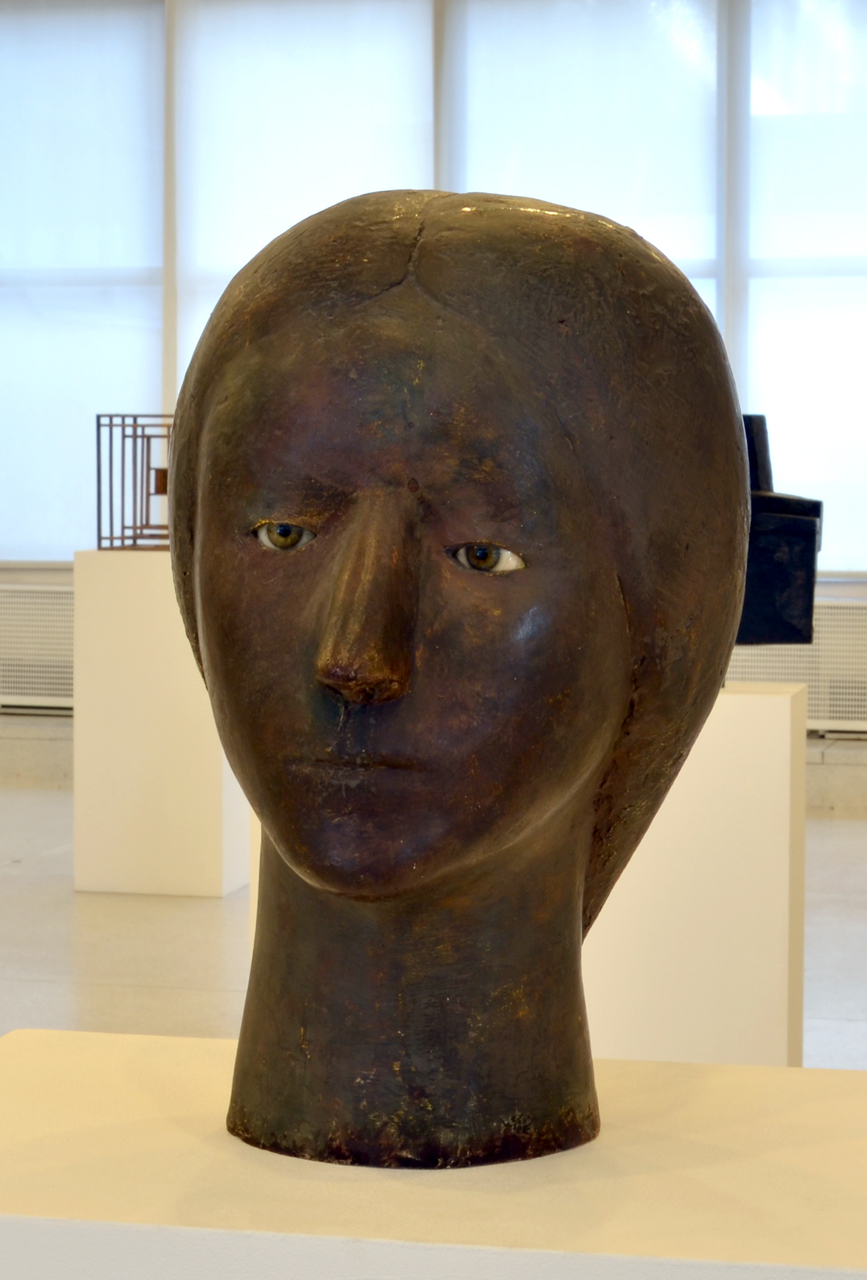
Head, 1957, patinated plaster, glass

The radical transformation of the figure resulted in a series of sculptures with a new content message (Dwelling, 1958, 1959), which Sekal then reworked in a different form in the 1980s. The term Dwelling comes from Kafka's short story Der Bau (1923–1924) (The Burrow, 1931) and is related to Sekal's need to find a shelter where he could escape from everyday traffic and work in a focused manner. Dwelling II takes the loosely anthropomorphic form of a war invalid and represents a transition to a transparent system of lines without an inner core (Dwelling, 1958) and sculptures that take on the form of a building (Dwelling, 1964). In the 1960s, his large-scale sculptures named Unsteady Structures are a means of self-identification and a representation of the feeling of fragility and the impossibility of finding a way out of this condition. He constructed the sculptures as living organisms by cutting through matter and adding elements that represented labyrinths and secret caves. At the same time, his first composed (folded) reliefs were created, conceived as wire tangles (Tangle, 1967).

Since the early 1960s, Sekal's figurative work has evolved towards a gradual deformation and simplification of form, sometimes with an emphasis on plastic volume (Dog, 1963), sometimes on the surface structures of sculpture (Signal, Tortured Torture, 1963). In the abstract themes, figuration is suppressed and empty volume plays an important role alongside mass (Signal, 1957, Letter, 1968) or the sculptures approach relief in rendering of surface (Dissection, 1963, Untitled, 1966).

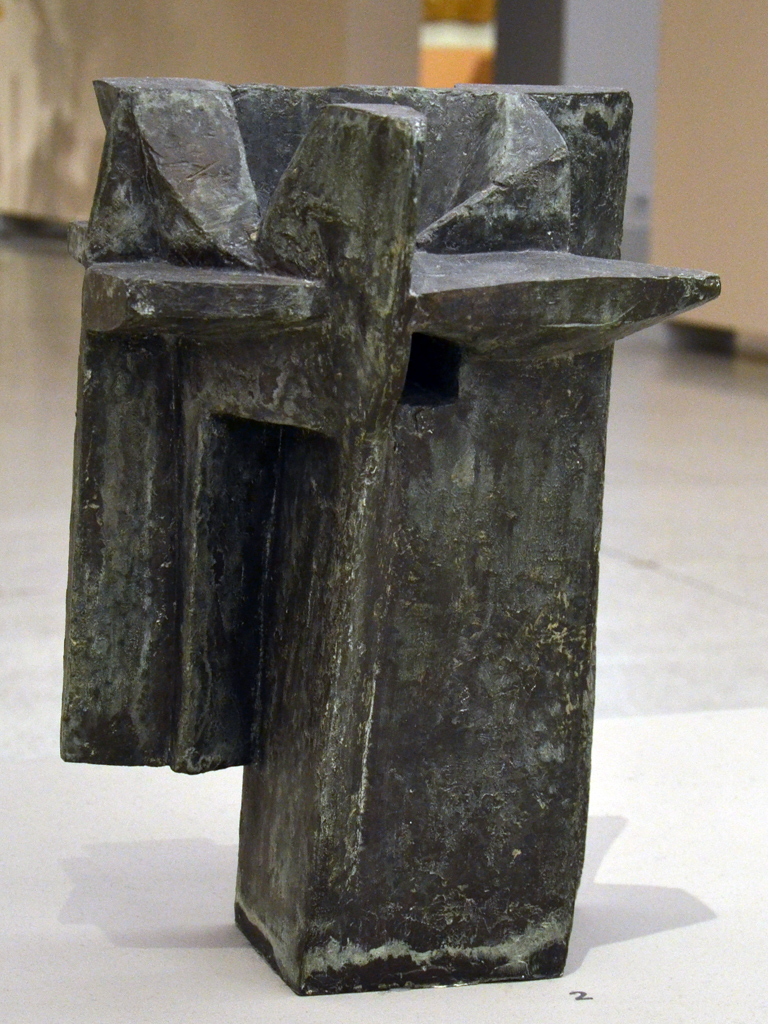
Dwelling I, 1958, patinated tin, National Gallery Prague

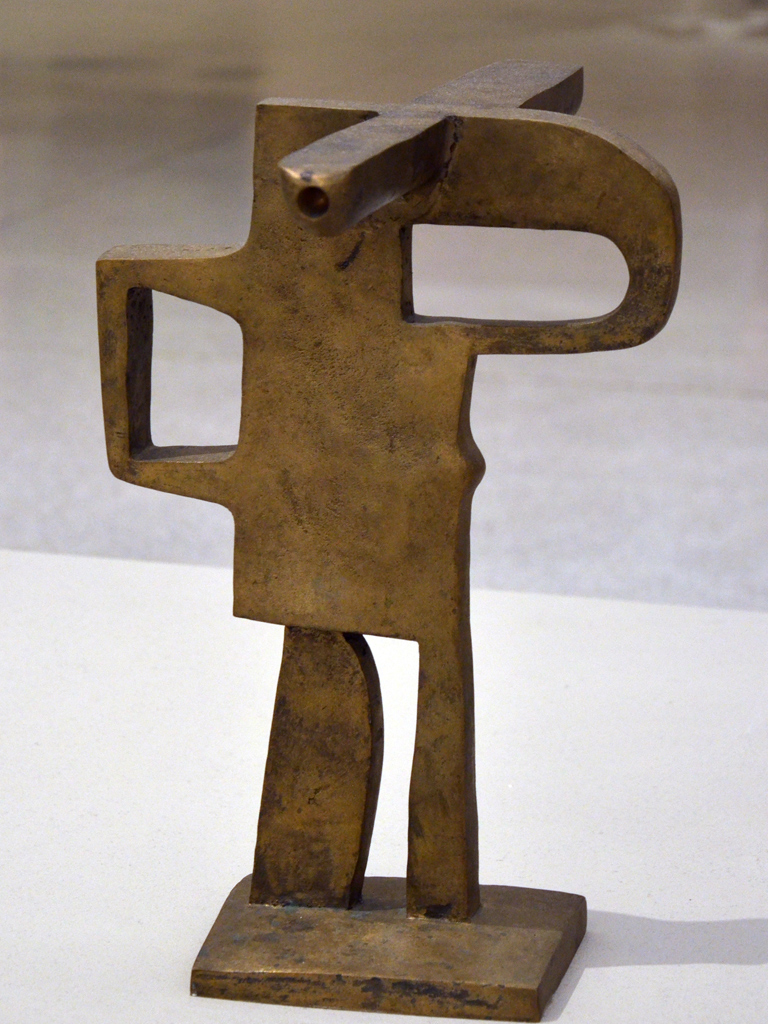
Figure, late 1950s, bronze, National Gallery Prague

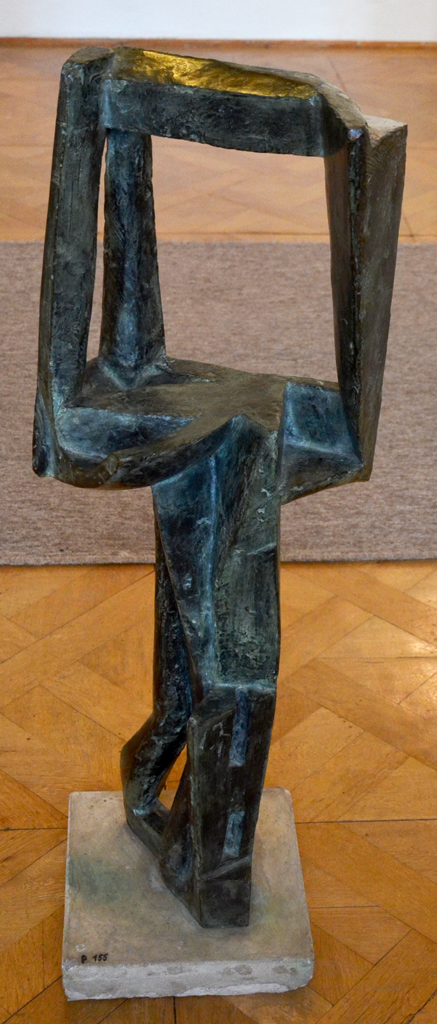
Limbs, 1962, bronze, Regional Gallery in Liberec

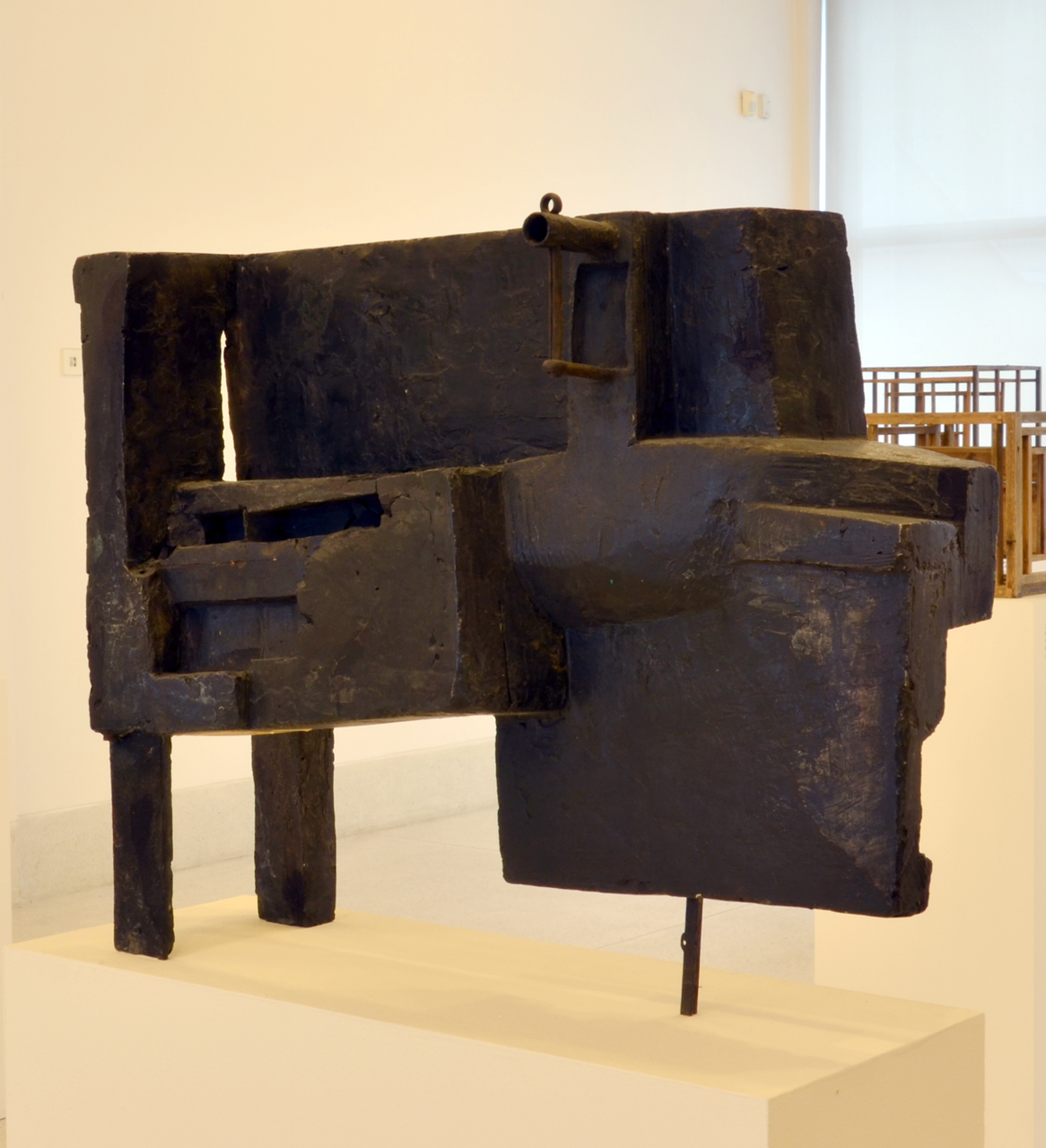
Little caves II, 1964, patinated plaster, iron

In the composed wire-mesh pieces (assembled pictures), which Sekal has been creating since 1962 in parallel with material collages on paper, and which he considers to be a different means of painting, the primary inspiration of surrealist assemblage is evident, which puts discarded and damaged objects into new contexts. For his assemblages, Sekal mostly used objects already used, marked by human activity. In 1962–1963, he created the first series of wooden assemblages in the series Off the Beaten Track, (Holzwege) which he followed up with a series of works during his stay in Düsseldorf (wall relief, 1970) and further works in 1991–1995, conceived as precise inlaid miniatures made of natural wood.

From 1964 onwards, he created intricate tangles of wire, fixed on wooden panels, which he called A Scheme for Purposeful Activity. By referring to Heidegger's notion of traffic (Betrieb), he expresses the existential significance of these labyrinths and his inner alienation from society. The surface structuring shared by artists of the Confrontation group, who worked with Informel in the mid-1960s, is gradually replaced by a new quality, consisting in the creation of an apparent or real geometric order (Palindrome I, Royal Walk, 1968) and a more organized form of labyrinth. Sekal worked with a variety of found metal fragments, and in composing the relief he emphasized the memory of the material and sought a new metaphorical meaning for it (Truce, 1966). Unlike some of his generation contemporaries, even in the second half of the 1960s he managed to avoid formal exaltation and aestheticization, and his works increasingly tended towards expressive and formal austerity. After his emigration, his assembled pictures became more characterized by a central symmetry, for which he found points of contact in the structural anthropology of Lévi Strauss.

The stone labyrinth Little Stone (Mauthausen) from the 1966 symposium in Sankt Marghareten and Sekal's Self-Portrait (1973) as a tangle of brass wires, made during his time in Stuttgart, are unique works. Already in the mid-1960s, and then after his emigration in the 1970s, the need to find order in the chaos of wires manifested itself in the depiction of the cross as a traditional Christian symbol. These artworks also resulted from two years of work on a set of furnishings for the church in Lustenau (1977–1979).

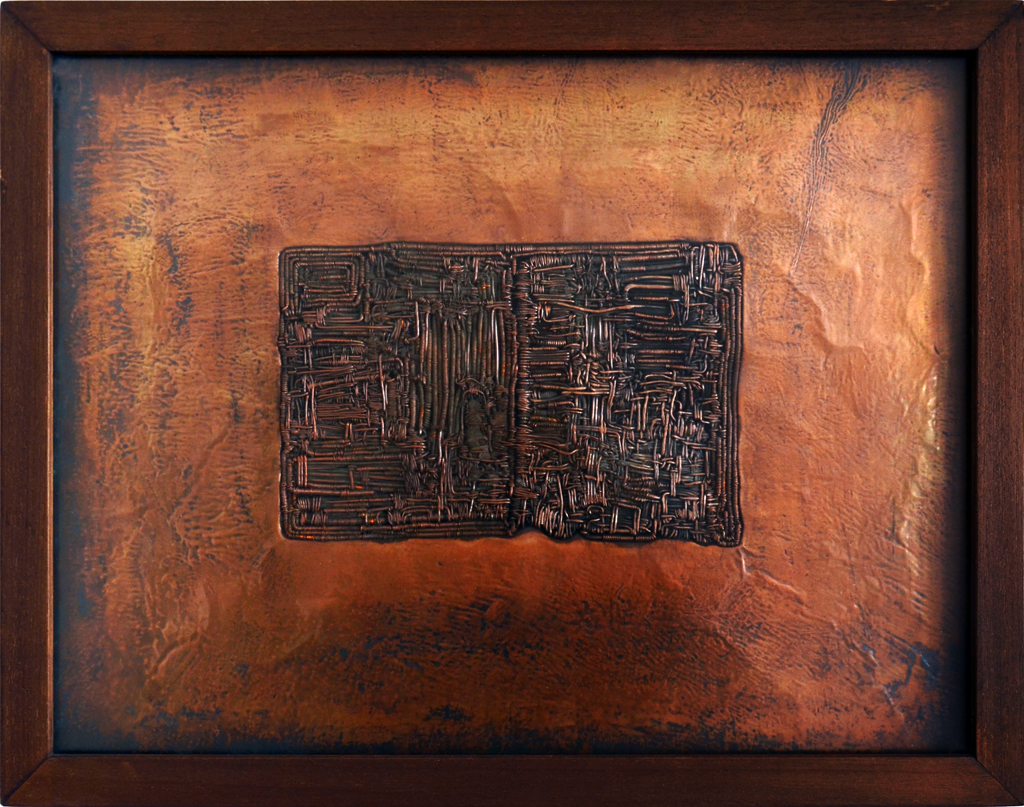
Untitled, 60s, private collection

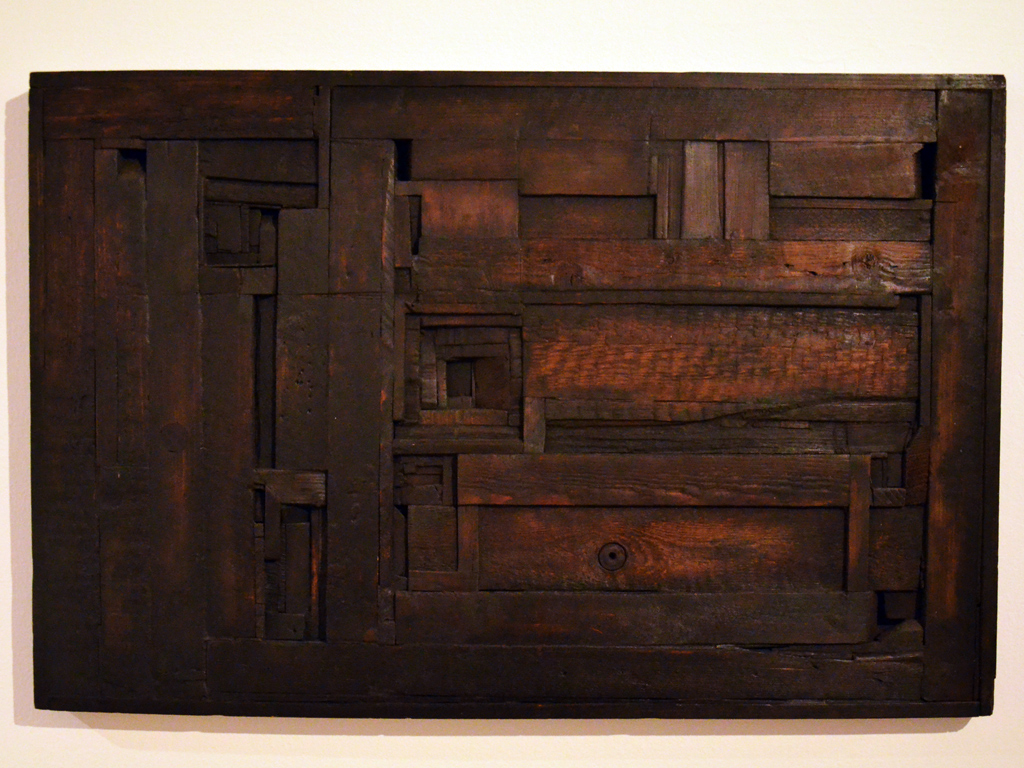
Off the Beaten Track (1960–65), Prague City Gallery

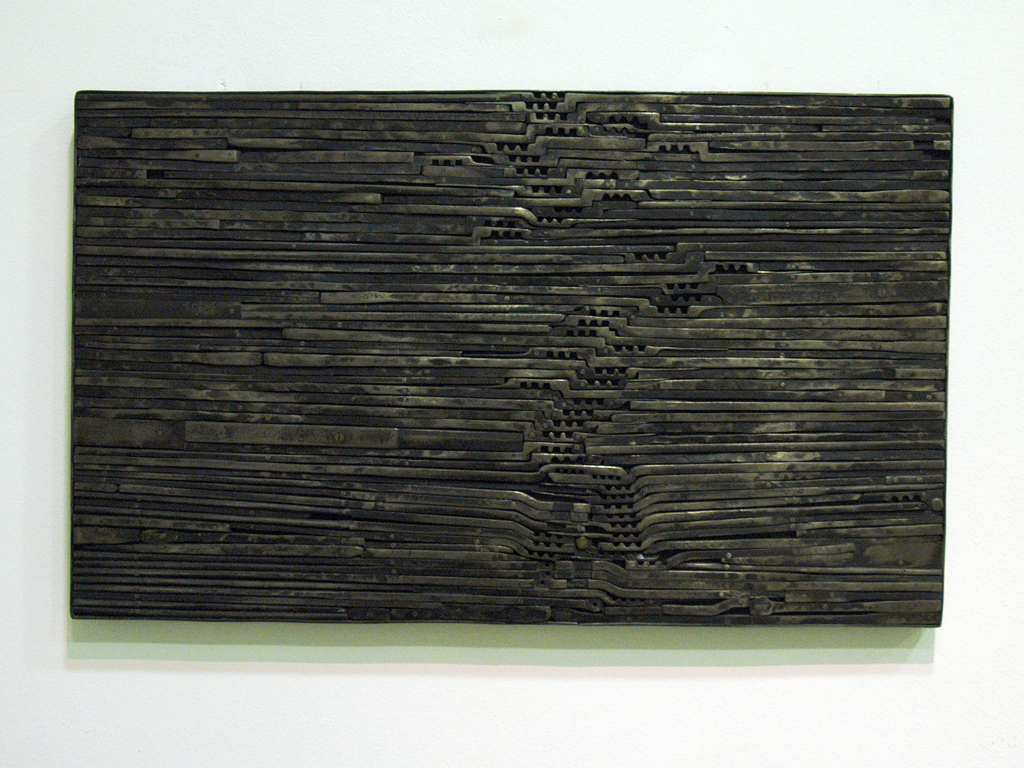
Firmly fixed, 1967

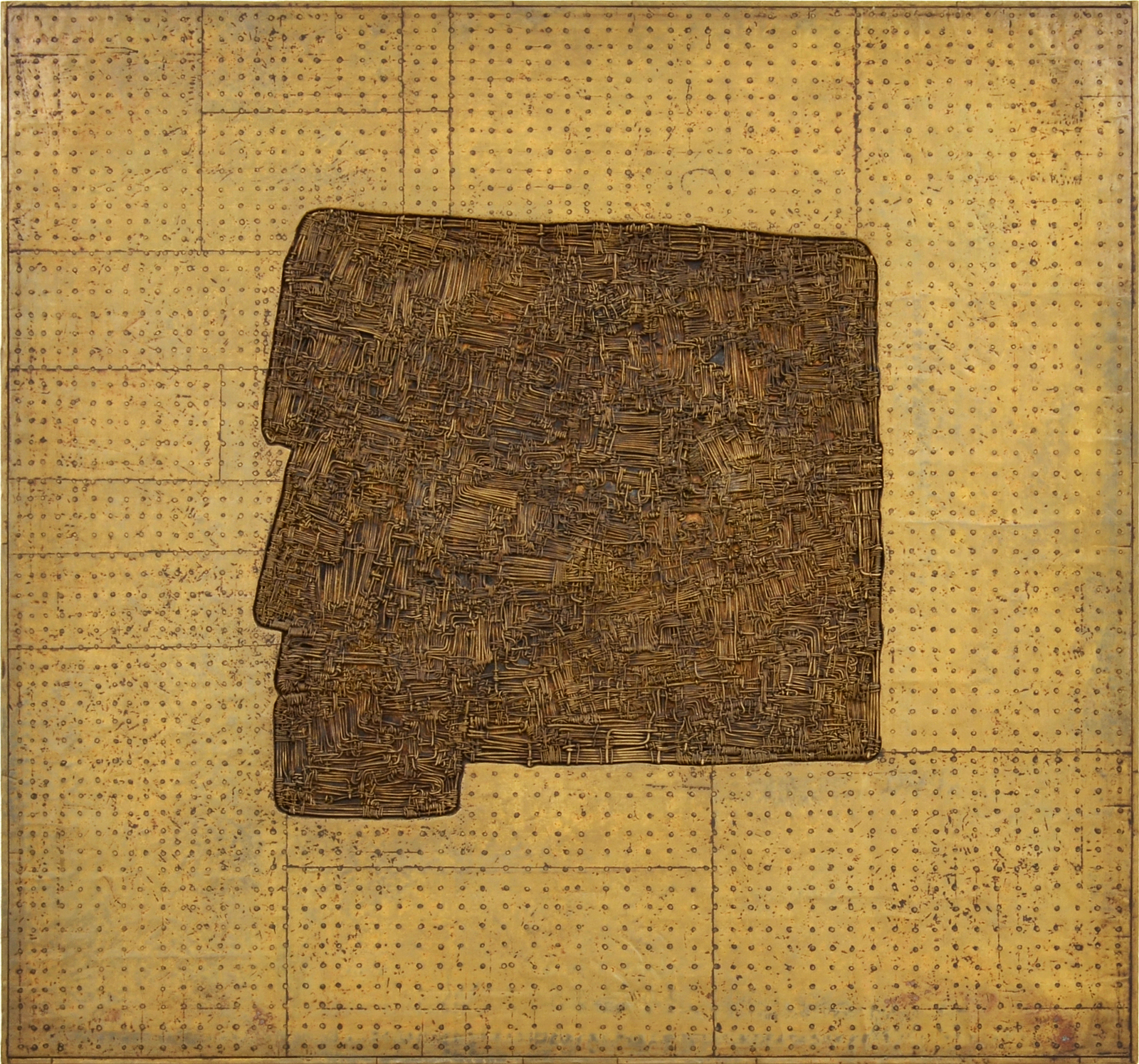
Big Head (Self-Portrait), 1973

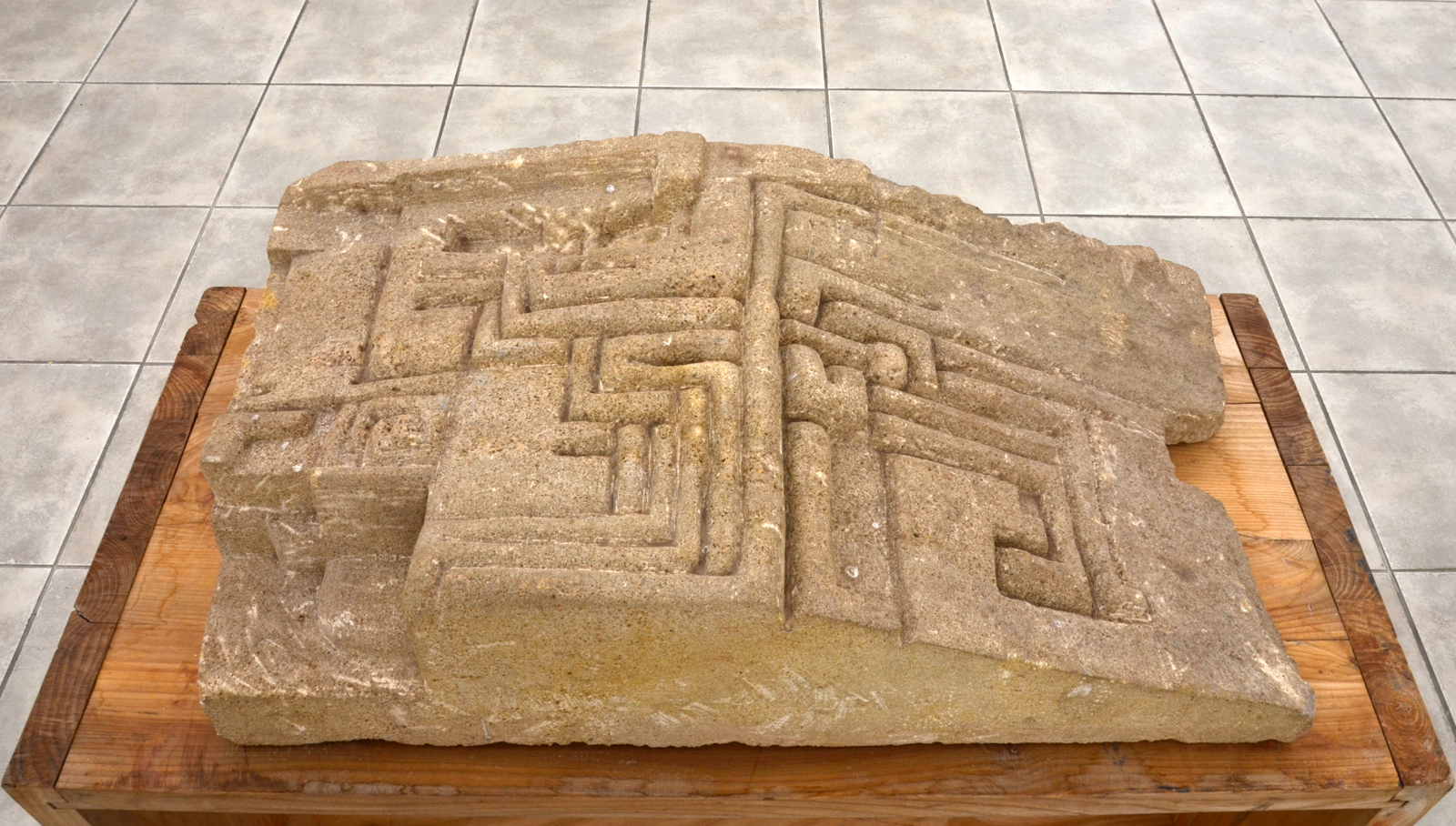
Small Stone (Mauthausen) II, 1966

In 1964 Sekal created a plaster statue of the Crucified Christ imitating early medieval works for Vláčil's film Markéta Lazarová. In the 1960s, he participated in the newly established ceramic symposium in Gmunden, where he created block abstract sculptures and, during his second participation, a statue of the Crucified (1965) assembled from ceramic blocks. From the symposium in Sankt Margarethen in 1966, he traveled to the Venice Biennale, which became a strong artistic and spiritual experience and contributed to the purification of the form of his sculptures and composed pictures in the following years.

In the chamber sculptures from the 1960s, there is still a rare hint of figuration (Please, No More, 1966); more often the titles symbolically denote the process of creation, as in Mikuláš Medek's paintings (Left - a Slightly Different Possibility, Truce, 1966), or refer to the process of rebirth of discarded things (What Remains of Forest, 1966). Although the starting points of Sekal's sculptures, reliefs and boxes refer to surrealism, he never considered himself a surrealist. Ultimately, the intellectual component, the exploration of spatial relationships and the desire to create order are always the defining process in his work.

Shortly before his emigration, Sekal was invited by architect Karel Filsak to design a ceramic tile facade for Prague's Intercontinental Hotel, which became one of the most outstanding brutalist architecture. Shortly after his departure from Czechoslovakia, he was commissioned by the director of Deutsche Bank to create a monumental wall made of stacked wood in David Hansemann's house in Düsseldorf. The wall, measuring about 6 x 12 m, has not survived and only designs on a scale of 1:10 are known.

After emigrating to Vienna, he initially had no studio and in his drawings he tried to thematically build on the works he had to leave behind in Prague. In the wooden reliefs there were traces of objects and events or a missing centre. In the composed pictures, this hole refers to the open mouths of the sculptures Screaming Mouth and Dead Head, but also to the original existential feeling at their creation (Hole, 1977). During a painting symposium in Eisenstadt in 1973, he created assembled pictures from pieces of leather (Third Attempt to Simulate a Magical Object, 1973) and continued to collect and preserve material for further works until the 1990s. He also created a series of assembled pictures with Christian motifs, in which the symbol of suffering, apart from the cross, is the spikes themselves (The Cross, 1972, 1977). The obsession with nails haunted Sekal throughout his life. From the 1960s onwards, he worked with a limited register of subjects and preserved their materiality, but he carried his formal sobriety to extreme consequences, especially in his later works with stigmatic objects. A completely personal and intimate part of his work is the assembling of objects in pictures into numerical series. He copes with the trauma of his imprisonment in a concentration camp by converting his prisoner's number into mere banal numerical operations (17 × 13 = 221, From Number Count, 1991, 58 × 58 = 3248, 1993).

In the late 1980s and early 1990s, Sekal returned to modeling and resumed miniature formats created in the early 1970s, which were prompted by a sense of confinement in the small space of the studio. The chamber sculptures created in Vienna refer to post-Cubist figuration (Bust, 1988, Figure, 1989), or are studies of the relationship between the organic world and abstract spatial forms, and deliberately do not refer to the real object (Untitled, 1988, 1990). Between 1985 and 1991, he used traces of plant juices, which he completed in watercolour by means of free form associations. In addition to drawings, he made collages using waste materials such as banana peels and salami skins.

The artist sometimes revisited the assembled pictures and reworked some of them. To avoid this, he came to the decision in 1983 to give them a third dimension in the form of boxes made of wooden slats, which he initially referred to as scaffolding. These protect the original core around which they were assembled as something precious, but the core is also the pretext for the whole construction. As can be seen from the artist's diaries, the idea of building the sculpture from the inside, from its core towards the space, had been on his mind since 1966 and then again when he created the tabernacle for the church in Lustenau in 1979. As an echo of the surrealist background of the sculptor's work, a common object, most often a board marked by traces of use, is usually at the centre of the boxes, while the box sometimes represents a valuable (Mahogany Box, 1985), often complex, strictly geometric and rational construction (Box with an indicated cross, 1992, Labyrinth, 1993). The need to prevent others from touching the work and to enclose it in a box arose while he was working on a tabernacle. It is also related to his interest in shamanism and black magic, which dates back to a visit to the Musée de l'Homme in Paris in 1947 and deepened during a stay in Amsterdam, where he visited the ethnographic collections at the Tropenmuseum and studied ethnological literature and books on magic and shamanism.

A series of Copper Cases (wire metal boxes) from the early 1990s contain no core and are rather a kind of outline of a sculpture, constructed into complex spatial forms (Copper Box, 1991). They are based on visual multiplicity and assembled from structural elements densely wrapped with thin copper wire with accentuated joints.

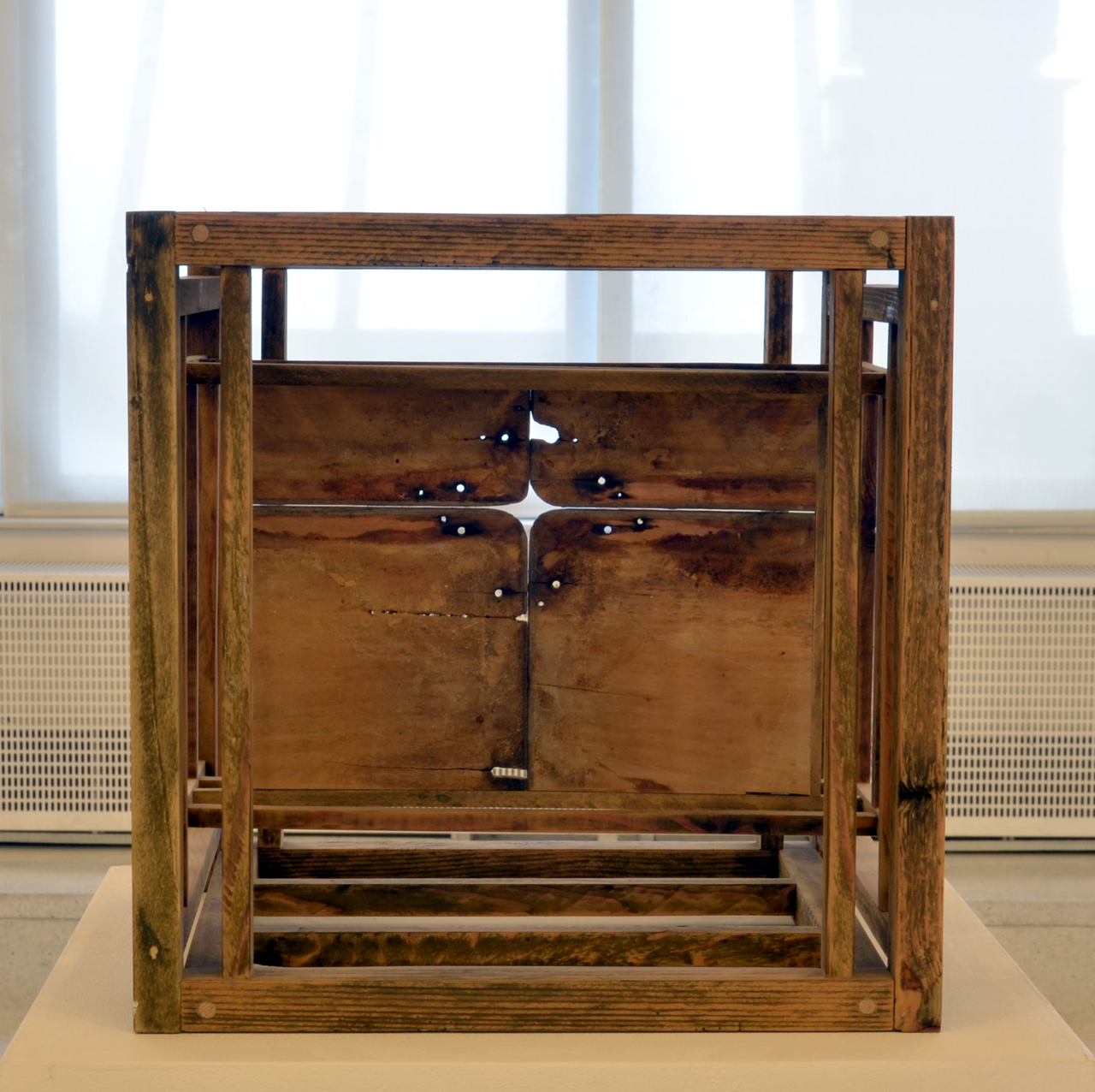
Box with a Cross, 1980s–1990s

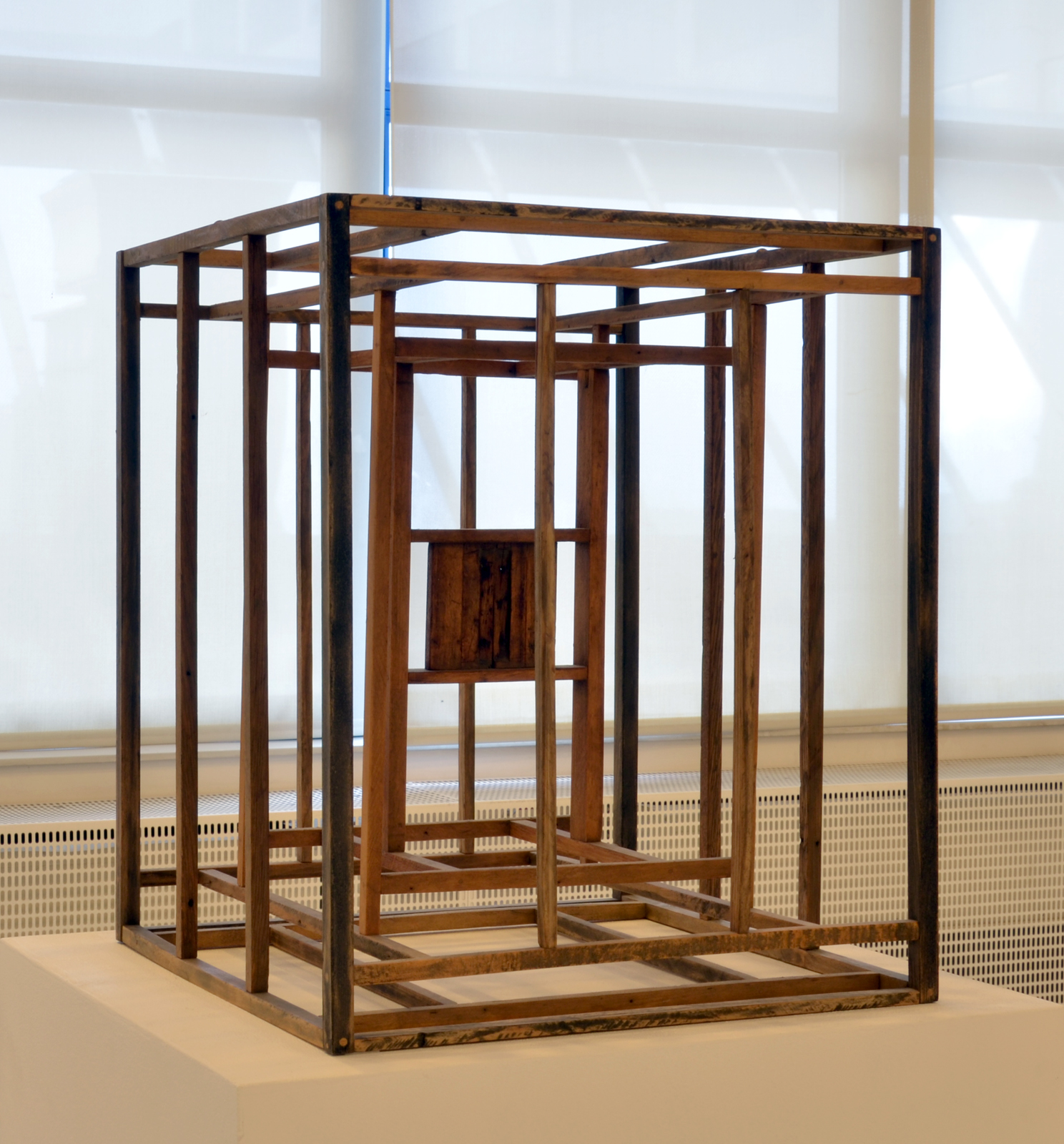
Box with four small boards, 1980s–1990s

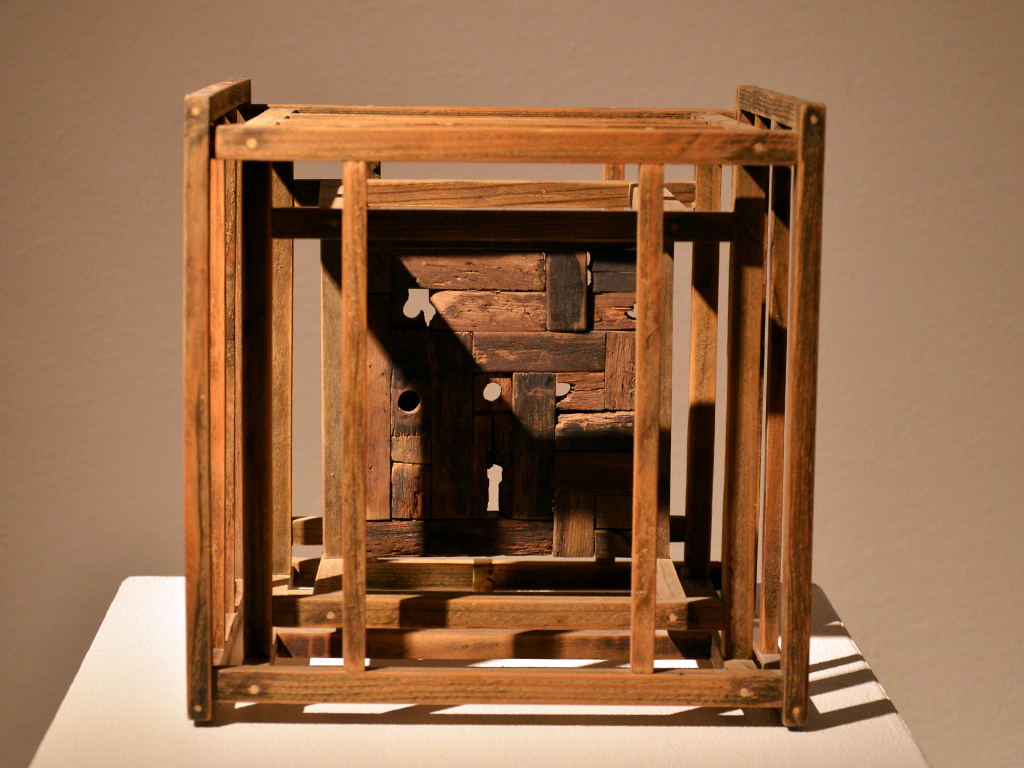
Untitled (Box), 1980s, private collection

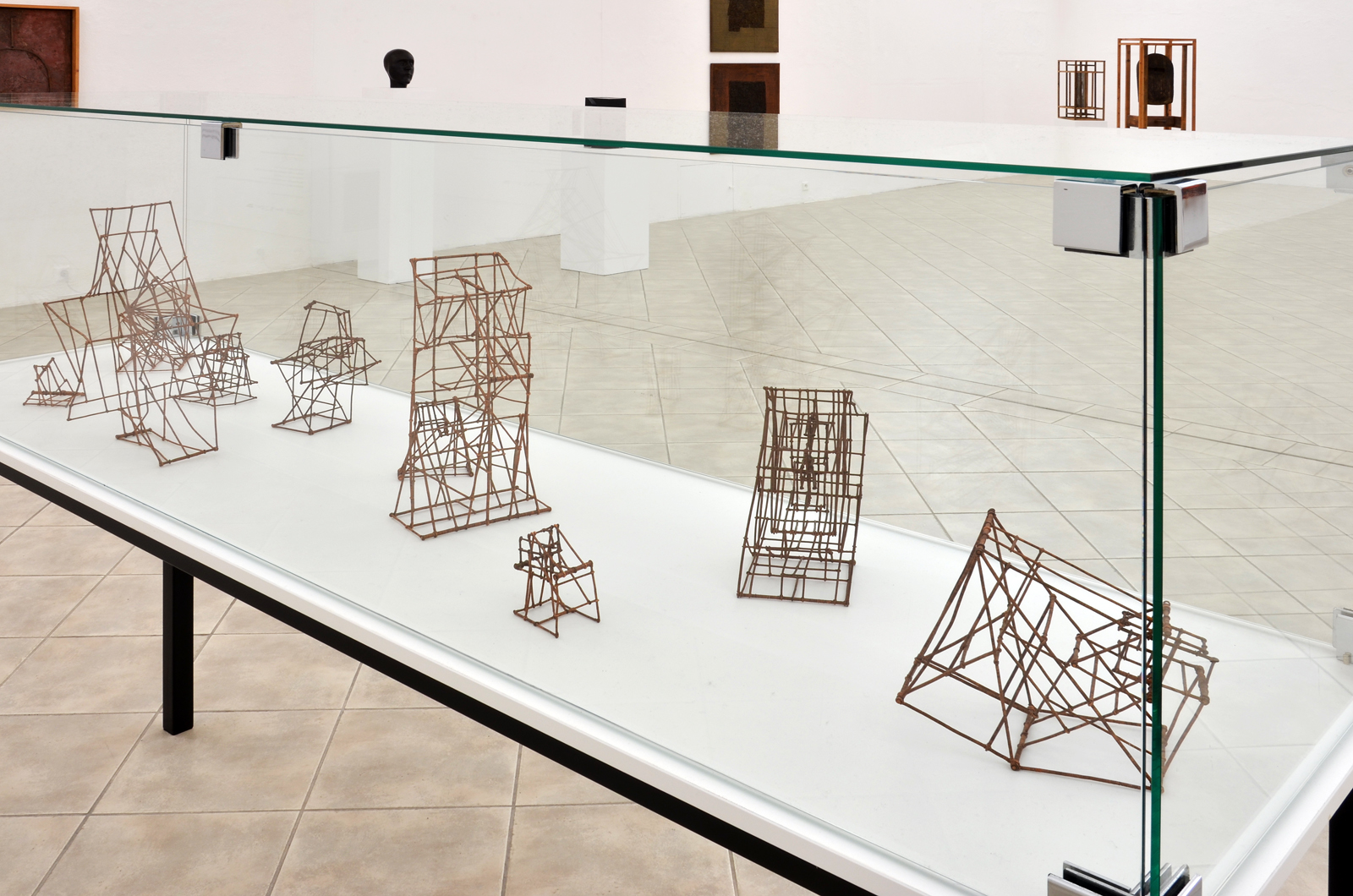
Copper boxes, after 1990

Sekal's sculptures from the late 1980s and early 1990s have a small scale and abstract geometric shapes, sometimes referring to figuration (Bust, 1988). After returning from Japan, he felt the need to create sculptures with a rounded organic shape and realized several variations based on a plaster cast of a found stone (Variations on the Kritzendorf Stone, 1992). At the same time, he designed a memorial to the writer H. P. Lovecraft (1990), a sculpture for the grave of Alfred Schmeller and the Memorial to the Jews of Vienna who were killed during the war (1992). Between 1995 and 1997, he redesigned the plaster sculptures that returned from Prague National Gallery. In particular, he cut up and reassembled the Unsteady Buildings, which he had intended for his retrospective exhibition at the Prague City Gallery. Sekal concluded his creative activity with an extraordinary accomplishment, transforming his last studio into a total work of art six months before his death. The studio was reinstalled in this form as part of the National Gallery exhibition of modern art at the Trade Fair Palace in Prague.

Sekal's entire oeuvre is deeply introvert, as the following quote from his text Abdication attests: "We want to go our own way, which we hardly know at all yet. We don't want to resemble other people, their faces are becoming more and more like the faces of idiots. It doesn't matter much about this observation, they consider us idiots too, it has always been like that. We don't want to be happy their way."

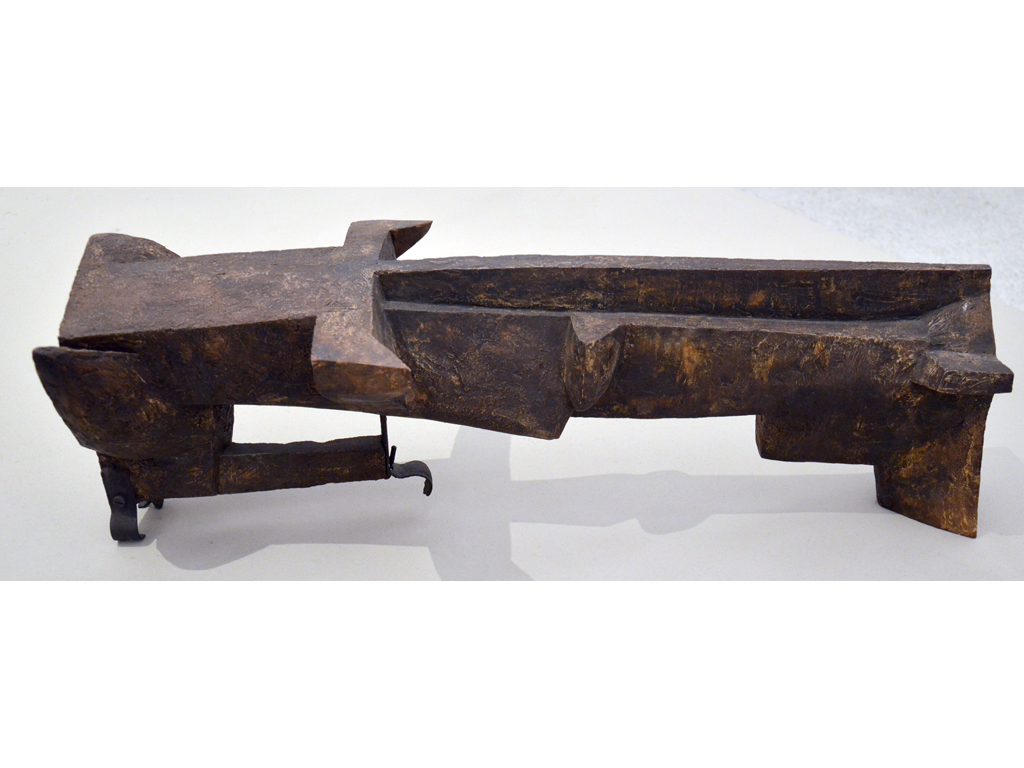
Plough (patinated plaster), 1962, National Gallery in Prague

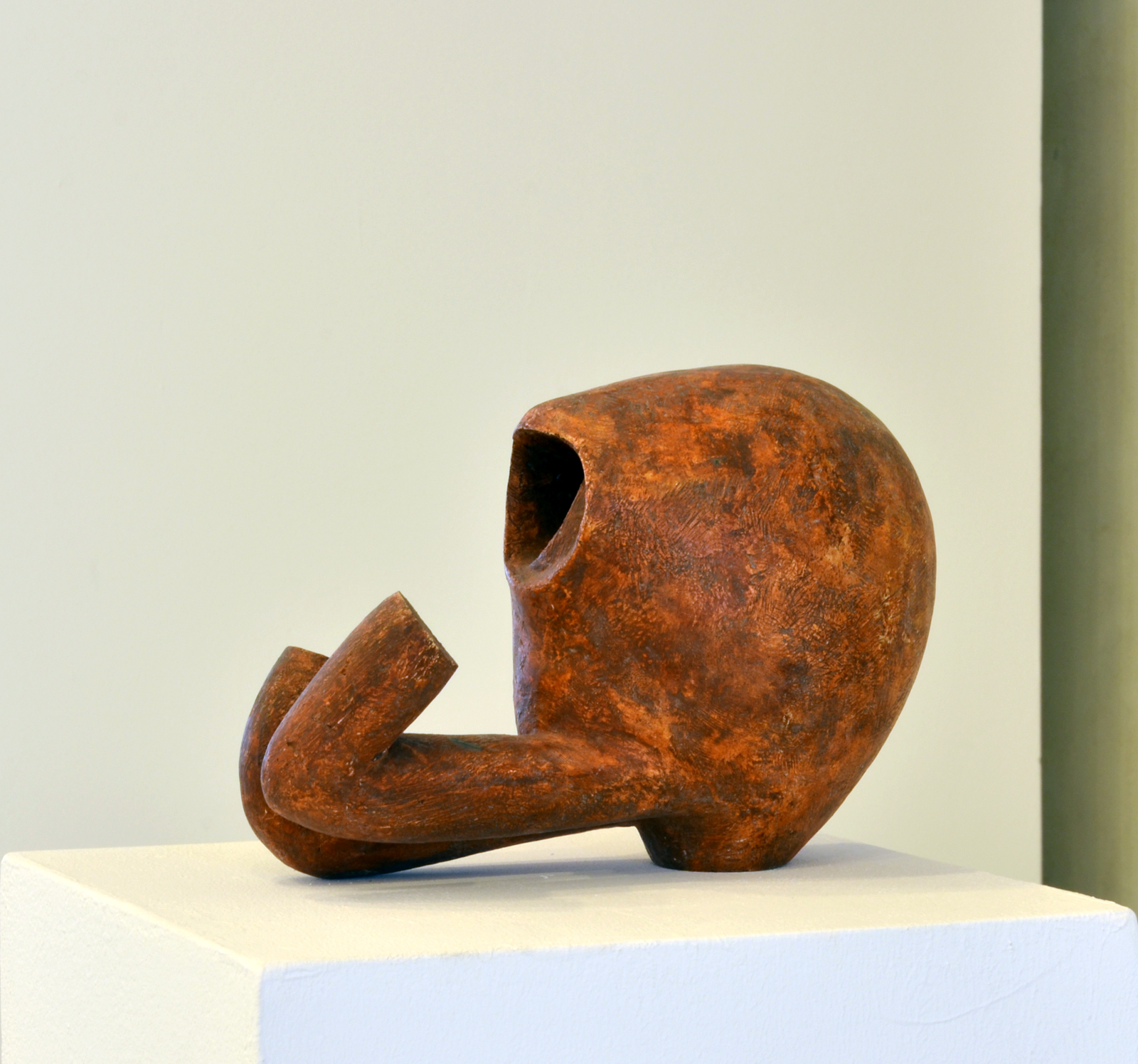
Embryo (1967), patinated plaster

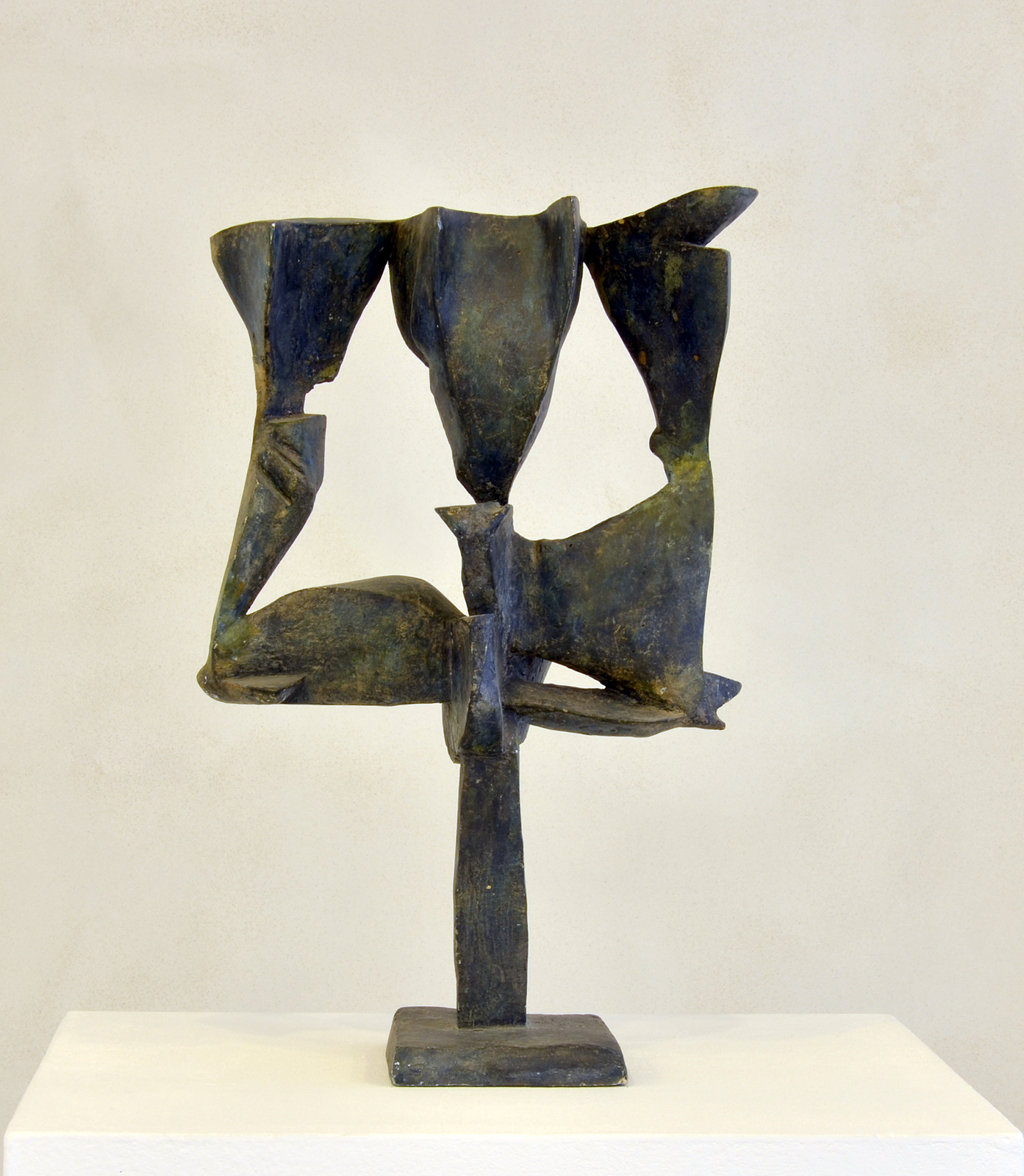
Plant named O. (1967), patinated plaster

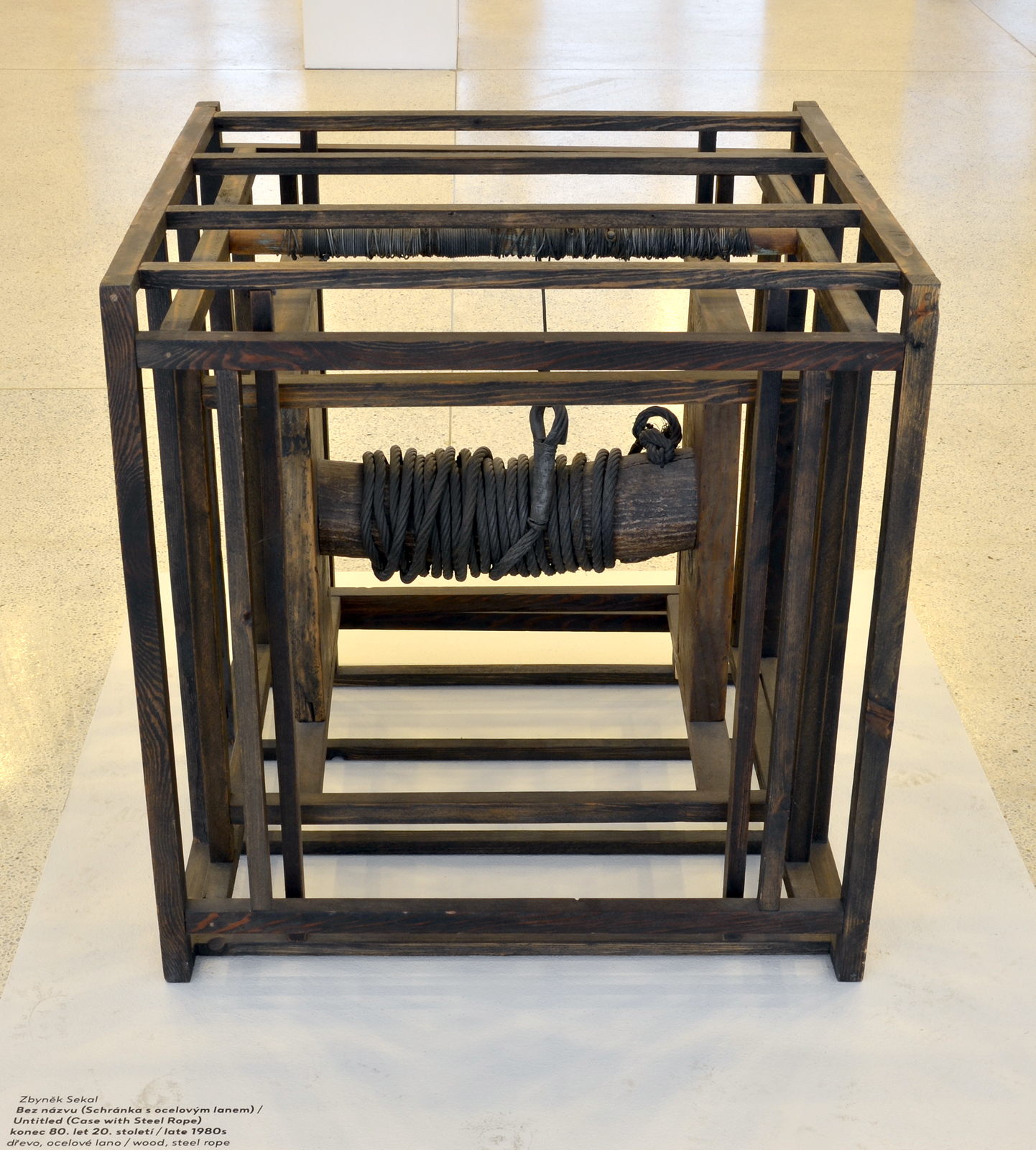
Untitled (box with steel cable), late 1980s

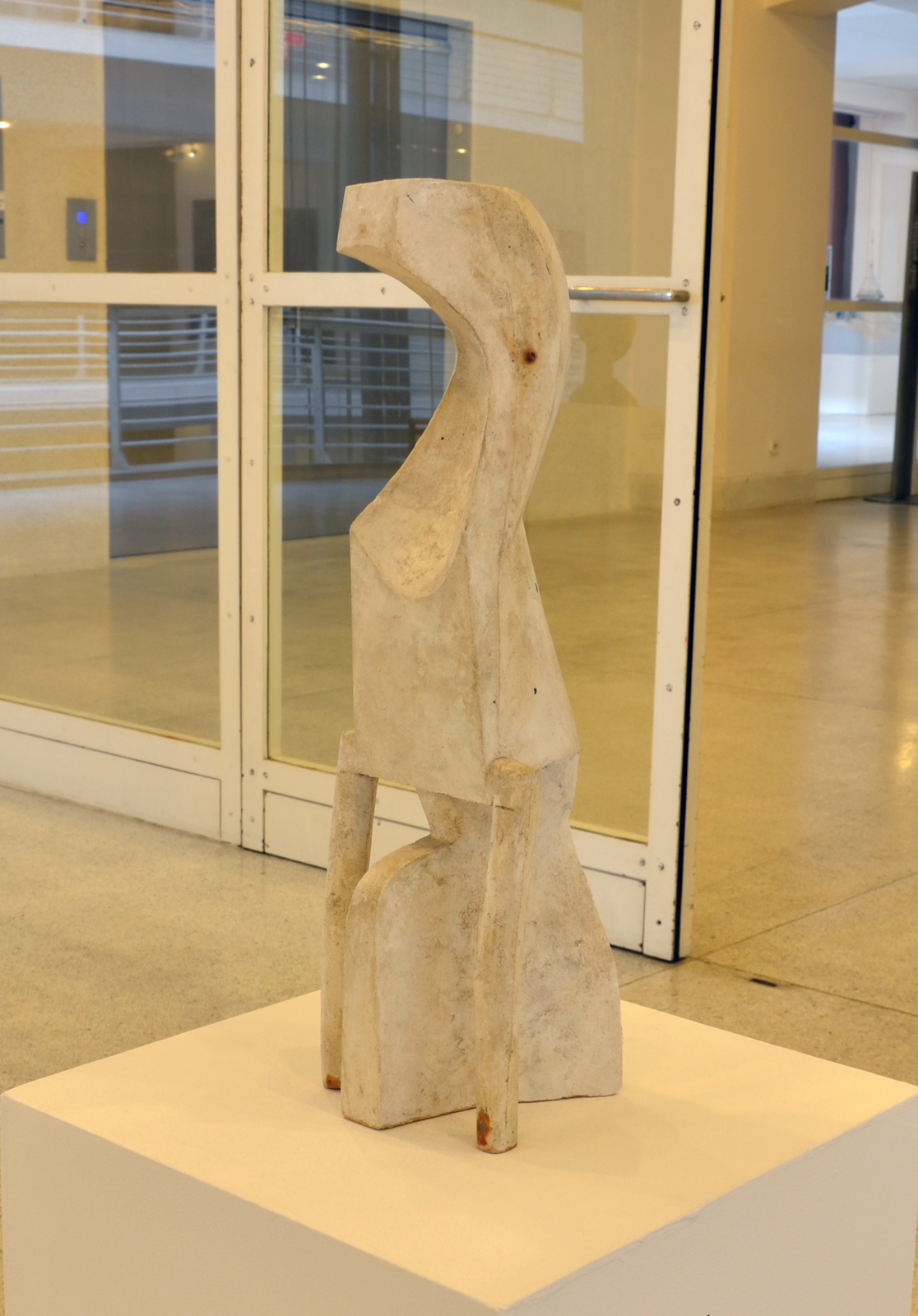
Untitled (1992), plaster cast

=== Translations ===
- Private translations of works by Franz Kafka, some published in Nový život journal
- 1952 Walter Bartel, Karl Liebknecht gegen Krupp, Rovnost, Prague
- 1954 Ludwig Feuerbach, Das Wesen des Christenthums, State Publishing House of Political Literature, Living Links; series II, vol. 15, Prague
- 1957 Franz Kafka, In the Penal Colony, part of a collection of ten novels, Čs. Spisovatel, Prague
- 1958 Christian Dietrich Grabbe, Don Juan und Faust, anthology, SNKLHU, World Reading; Vol. 195, Prague
- 1959 Ludwig Feuerbach, Principles of Future Philosophy and Other Philosophical Works, anthology (Sämtliche Werke, Band 1, 2, ), Philosophical Library, Works of the Czechoslovak Academy of Sciences. Section of Economics, Law and Philosophy, Prague
- 1960 Georg Büchner, Dantons Tod, Orbis, Edition.
- 1963 Franz Kafka, Die Verwandlung, SNKLU 1st ed., Prague, 1990 Primus, Prague, ISBN 80-900078-2-1
- 1968 Günter Grass, Katz und Maus, Odeon, Edition: Contemporary World Prose. Small Series, Prague, 3rd ed. 2009, Atlantis Prague, ISBN 978-80-7108-312-2
- 1992 Günter Grass, The Tin Drum (Die Blechtrommel), Odeon, Edition. Prestigious Club, Prague, ISBN 80-207-0391-8
- 1996 Carl von Clausewitz, Vom Kriege, 2nd ed. Bonus A, Brno, ISBN 80-85914-27-1, 2008 Academia, Prague, ISBN 978-80-200-1598-3

=== Texts ===
- Abdication (1951), used as the final chapter of Bohumil Hrabal´s The Tender Barbarian
- Ralentir travaux LXV (1965), Výtvarné umění 1, 1966
- Nautilus (1986), manuscript, the estate of Z. Sekal, Vienna
- Diaries - Sekal kept a detailed diary from his early youth, practically daily, rarely with longer breaks. For him as an introvert, the diary was a partner in dialogue and a place for self-reflection and permanent intellectual revision of his work. Older entries were often rewritten in the pursuit of perfection and took the form of literature intended for publication. In the last years of his life, this need intensified and it became a ritual stereotype - a kind of continuous litany structured by an identical entry formula in which he gives the exact time and his position in space. The diaries make clear his obsession with work, which also became his struggle for life.

=== Illustrations ===
- 1947 Viktor Dyk: The Pied Piper

=== Film posters ===
- The Wind Calms Down Before Dawn (1960), Test Drive (1962), Festive Ride (1964)

=== Book designs ===
- Breton A: Magnetic Fields, Meyrink G: Golem, Kafka F: Transformation, Lorca F. G: Poet in New York, Kesten H: Happy People, Kisch E. E: American Paradise

Covers and typography

- 1962/1964 State Publishing House of Fine Literature and Art, n.p., Prague
- 1967/1970 Odeon, publishing house of fine literature and art, n.p., Prague
- 1969 revue Světová literatura

=== Exhibition catalogues ===
- own – 1965, 1969, 1988, 1997,
- other artists (Eva Kmentová, Adolf Hoffmeister, Mikuláš Medek, Jan Svoboda, Ladislav Novák (artist), Zdeněk Palcr, Stanislav Podhrázský, Etapa, Graphics 65, Contemporary Art from Austria

=== Realizations ===
- 1968 Fairmont Golden Prague Hotel, Prague - vertical strips made of ceramic tiles
- 1970 Wood Relief 6 x 12 m, David Hansen House, Düsseldorf
- 1977/1979 Altar, ambo, tabernacle, Lustenau Church, Vorarlberg

== Representation in collections ==
- National Gallery in Prague
- Moravian Gallery in Brno
- Generali Foundation, Vienna
- Museum Bochum, Bochum
- Museum des 20. Jahrhunderts (20er Haus) / Museum Moderner Kunst, Vienna
- Rupertinum, Salzburg
- Museum of Art Olomouc
- Aleš South Bohemian Gallery in Hluboká nad Vltavou
- Central Bohemian Region Gallery in Kutná Hora
- Gallery Klatovy, Klenová
- Regional Gallery in Liberec
- Benedikt Rejt Gallery, Louny
- Gallery of the Capital City of Prague
- Art Gallery Karlovy Vary
- North Bohemia Art Gallery in Litoměřice
- Gallery of Modern Art in Roudnice nad Labem
- Gallery of Modern Art in Hradec Králové
- Gallery of Fine Arts in Cheb
- West Bohemian Gallery in Plzeň
- Private collections at home and abroad

== Exhibitions ==
=== Solo ===
- 1961 Sochy, galerie na Karlově náměstí
- 1965 Sochy – reliéfy: 1948–1965, Galerie Václava Špály, Praha
- 1965 Sochy – reliéfy: 1948–1965, Dům pánů z Kunštátu, Brno
- 1965 Zbyněk Sekal: assemblages, Miloslav Chlupáč: sculptures, Galerie im Greichenberisl, Vienna
- 1969 Skládané obrazy a sochy, Galerie Václava Špály, Praha
- 1971 Bilder und Skulpturen, Galerie im Griechenbeisl, Vienna
- 1977 Zusammengesetzte Bilder, Zeichnungen, Neue Galerie des Landesmuseum Joanneum in Graz, Museum Bochum, Museum des 20. Jahrhunderts, Vídeň
- 1982, 1985, 1987 Geflechte Anwendungen eines Verfahrens, Neue Galerie, Vienna
- 1988 Bronzek, Zeichnungen, Neue Galerie, Vienna
- 1990 Galerie Stubenbastei, Vienna
- 1991 Scultore, Studio oni de Rossi, Verona
- 1991 Rupertinum, Salcburk
- 1992 Skulpturen, Materialbilder, Zeichnungen, Gerüste 1967–1991, Künstlerhaus Klagenfurt
- 1992/93 Některé práce z let 1940–1992, Dům umění města Brna, Dům umění v Opavě, Galéria Médium, Bratislava
- 1997 Works for the last fifty-five years / Arbeiten aus den letzten fünfundfünfzig Jahren, Prague City Gallery
- 2003 Plastiky a reliéfy 1959–1994, Galerie Ztichlá klika, Praha, Galerie Caesar, Olomouc
- 2010 Skládané obrazy, sochy a schránky, Brno Gallery CZ, Brno
- 2012 Skládané obrazy a schránky, Topičův salon, Praha
- 2014 Sekal and Japan. Greetings to a distant land, Greetings from a distant land, West Bohemian Gallery in Plzeň
- 2015 A věci se zvolna berou před se, Muzeum umění Olomouc
- 2016 Young Sekal - Drawings from the camp and other..., Terezín Memorial
- 2020 Zbyněk Sekal, Belvedere Museum Wien
- 2022 Drawings and intimate sculptures, Becher Villa, Karlovy Vary
- 2023 Zbyněk Sekal: Sekal 100, Museum Kampa
- 2023 Zbyněk Sekal: Paměť / Memory, Moravian Regional Museum Brno

=== Collective (selection) ===
- 1964 Sculpture 1964, Liberec
- 1965 Tschechoslowakische Kunst heute: Profile V, Städtische Kunstgalerie, Bochum
- 1965 Małarstwo a rzeźba z Pragi, Cracow
- 1965 Keramik aus 12 ländern, Internationaler Künstlerclub IKC (Palais Pálffy), Vienna
- 1965 La transfiguration de l'art tcfhéque: Peinture - sculpture - verre - collages, Palais de Congres, Liege
- 1966 Tschechoslowakische Kunst der Gegenwart, Akademie der Künste, Berlín
- 1966 Tokyo International Exhibition of Art, Tokyo
- 1966 Tschechoslowakische Plastik von 1900 bis zur Gegenwart, Museum Folkwang, Essen
- 1967 Moderne Kunst aus Prag, Celle, Soest, Kunsthalle zu Kiel
- 1967 Mostra d'arte contemporanea cecoslovacca, Castello del Valentino, Torino
- 1967 17 tsjechische kunstenaars (17 Czech Artists), Galerie Orez, Den Haag
- 1968 Sculpture tchècoslovaque de Myslbek à nos jours, Musée Rodin, Paris
- 1969 L'art tcheque actuel, Renault Champs - Élysées, Paris
- 1969 Arte contemporanea in Cecoslovacchia, Galleria Nazionale d'Arte Moderna e Contemporanea (GNAM), Rome
- 1970 Tschechische Skulptur des 20. Jahrhunderts: Von Myslbek bis zur Gegenwart, Schloß Charlottenburg - Orangerie, Berlin
- 1971 Imago, Galerie im Greichenbeisl, Schloss Lengenfeld
- 1974 Wiener Secession, Krems
- 1974 Neue Mitglieder der Wiener Secession, Wien
- 1974 Tschechische Künstler, Galerie Wendtorf + Swetec, Düsseldorf
- 1976 Parallelaktion, Neue Kunst aus Österreich, Von der Heydt Museum, Wuppertal
- 1980 Die Kunst Osteuropas im 20. Jahrhundert, Garmisch-Partenkirchen
- 1982 Künstler, Die kamen und blieben, Secession, Wien
- 1983/84 Das Prinzip Hoffnung. Aspekte der Utopie in der Kunst und Kultur des 20. Jahrhunderts, Museum Bochum
- 1989 Wo bleibst du, Revolution?, Museum Bochum, Bochum
- 1990 Polymorphie: Kunst als subversives Element Tschechoslowakei 1939–1990, Martin-Gropius-Bau, Berlin
- 1990 Galerie Stubenbastei, Wien
- 1991 Rupertinum, Salcburk
- 1991 Studio Toni de Rossi, Verona
- 1991 Czech Informel. Pioneers of Abstraction 1957–1964, Prague City Gallery
- 1992 Czech Fine Art 1960–1990, Central Bohemian Gallery, Prague
- 1993 Czech Fine Art 1930–1960, Czech Museum of Fine Arts, Prague
- 1993/94 Record of the Most Diverse Factors... Czech Painting of the Second Half of the 20th Century from the Collections of State Galleries, Prague Castle Riding Hall
- 1994 Grey Brick 66/1994 Exile, U Bílého jednorožce Gallery, Klatovy
- 1994 Focal Points of Rebirth, Prague City Gallery
- 1997 Aspekte imaginativer Kunst im 20. Jahrhundert: Profil und Perspektiven einer Sammlung, Museum Bochum
- 1997 Czech Imaginative Art, Rudolfinum Gallery, Prague
- 1999 The Art of Accelerated Time. Czech Art Scene 1958–1968, Prague, Cheb
- 2002/2004 The World of Stars and Illusions. Czech Film Posters of the 20th Century, Moravian Gallery in Brno, Mánes, Prague, Czech Centre New York, Czech Centre London, Consulate General of the Czech Republic, Los Angeles, Czech Cultural Centre, Bratislava, Czech Centre Dresden, Consulate General of the Czech Republic, Hong Kong, Art Gallery Karlovy Vary, Macao Museum of Art
- 2003 Art is Abstraction. Czech Visual Culture of the 1960s, Prague Castle Riding Hall, Museum of Decorative Arts, Brno, Salon, Kabinet, Olomouc
- 2004/06 Šedesátá / The sixties, From the collection of the Zlatá husa Gallery in Prague, Brno House of Arts, Karlovy Vary Art Gallery
- 2007 Máj 57 Group, Prague Castle, Imperial Stables, Prague
- 2007/8 Soustředěný pohled / Focused View. Graphics of the 1960s from the collections of the member galleries of the Council of Galleries of the Czech Republic, Regional Gallery in Liberec, Liberec, Regional Gallery of the Highlands in Jihlava
- 2008 Nechci v kleci! / No cage for me!, Museum of Art Olomouc
- 2010 New Sensitivity, National Art Museum of China, Beijing
- 2010 Years in days. Czech Art 1945–1957, Prague City Gallery
- 2010 Czech Art in Exile / Tschechische Kunst im Exil, Vienan, Galerie G, Olomouc
- 2012 Czech Modern Art, Gallery of Fine Arts in Cheb
- 2014 Best of artmark collection I, Galerie Artmark, Vienna
- 2015 Die achtziger Jahre in der Sammlung des MUSA, MUSA Museum Start Gallery Artothek, Wien
- 2019 Nezlomní: Od Franze Kafky po sametovou revoluci / The Steadfast: From Franz Kafka to the Velvet Revolution, Municipal house, Prague
- 2022/2023 Das Tier in Dir: Kreaturen in (und außerhalb) der mumok Sammlung / The Animal Within: Creatures in (and outside) the mumok Collection, MUMOK - Museum Moderner Kunst Stiftung Ludwig Wien

== Sources ==
=== Monographs ===
- Marie Klimešová: Zbyněk Sekal (cz, en), 543 p., Řevnice: Arbor vitae, 2015, ISBN 978-80-7467-088-6.
- Marie Klimešová: Zbyněk Sekal and Japan, Arbor vitae 2014, ISBN 978-80-7467-064-0

=== Author catalogues ===
- Zbyněk Sekal: Sculptures - reliefs 1948–1965, Kříž J., cat. 30 p., no., fr., SČVU, Prague 1965
- Zbyněk Sekal: Folded paintings and sculptures, Chalupecký J., cat. 12 p., SČVU, Prague 1969
- Zbyněk Sekal: Bilder und Skulpturen, Travaux R, cat. 12 p., de., Vienna 1971
- Zbyněk Sekal: Zusammengesetzte Bilder (Zeichnungen), Cage J et al., cat. 68 p., Graz 1977
- Zbyněk Sekal: Geflechte Anwendungen eines Verfahrens, cat. 24 p., Neue Galerie, Wien 1982
- Zbyněk Sekal: Bronzen, Zeichnungen, Sotriffer K., cat. 44 p., Neue Galerie, Wien 1988
- Sekal: scultore, Martini S, Sekal Z, cat. 40 p., Studio oni de Rossi, Verona 1991
- Zbyněk Sekal: Some works from 1940 to 1992, Hofmann W, Sekal Z, Valoch J, cat. 47 p., no., no., Brno House of Arts 1992, ISBN 80-7009-052-9
- Zbyněk Sekal: Skulpturen, Materialbilder, Zeichnungen, Gerüste (1967–1991), Hofmann W, Sekal Z, cat. 36 p., no., Künstlerhaus Klagenfurt 1992
- Zbyněk Sekal: Works of the last fifty-five years, Baumann H, Hofmann W, Klimešová M, Sekal Z, cat. 184 p., no., no., GHMP, Prague 1997, ISBN 80-7010-043-5
- Zbyněk Sekal, And things are slowly taking over, Alšova jihočeská galerie, Arbor vitae, 2015, ISBN 978-80-87799-40-6

=== Collective catalogues (selection) ===
- Tschechoslowakische Kunst Heute – Profile V, Kotalík J., Leo P., Míčko M., 166 p., (de), Städtische Kunstgalerie, Bochum 1965
- Aktuální tendence českého umění / Tendances actuelles de l'art tchéque, Míčko M., 162 p., (cz, fr), AICA, Prague 1966
- Wo bleibst du, Revolution?, Astier P et al., 156 p., (de), Museum Bochum 1989
- Czech Informel, Pioneers of Abstraction 1957–1964, Dufek A., Nešlehová M., Valoch J., 266 p., Prague City Gallery 1991
- Foci of Rebirth, Czech Art 1956–1963, Bregant M. et al., 447 p., (cz, en), Prague City Gallery 1994, ISBN 80-7010-029-X
- Šedesátá / The sixties, Juříková M., Železný V., 414 p., (cz, en), Galerie Zlatá husa, Prague 2004, ISBN 80-239-3406-6
- New Sensitivity / Nová citlivost, Czech Sculpture of the 1960s - 1980s / České sochařství 60.-80. let 20. století, Knížák M et al., 189 p., (cz, en, chin), National Gallery Prague 2010

=== Books and encyclopedias (selection) ===
- Fernand Hazan (ed.), Nouveau dictionnaire de la sculpture moderne, Paris 1970, p. 279-280
- Geneviève Bénamou (ed.), Sensibilités contemporaines / Contemporary artistic sensibilities, 70 artistes d'origine tchégue et slovaque hors tchécoslovaquie / 70 artists of Czech and Slovak origin living outside Czechoslovakia 1970–1984, 297 p., ang., fr., Paris 1985, ISBN 2-9500702-1-3
- Chalupecký J., Nešlehová M., New Art in Bohemia, 173 p., H&H, s. r. o., Jinočany 1994, ISBN 80-85787-81-4
- Nešlehová M., Poselství jiného výrazu, Pojetí informelu v českém umění 50. a první poloviny 60. let / The Message of Another Expression, The Concept of Informel in Czech Art of the 1950s and the First Half of the 1960s, (cz, en), 286 p., Artefact Prague 1997, ISBN 80-902160-0-5 BASE Publishing ISBN 80-902481-0-1
- Hůla J., Interviews, 122 p., Dauphin Publishing House, Prague 2001, ISBN 80-86019-74-8
- Morganová P. et al., České umění 1938-1989 / Czech Art 1938–1989, Programs, critical texts, documents, 520 s., Academia Praha 2001, ISBN 80-200-0930-2
- Erhart G., Colourful Trajectories of Dreams, publisher. H+H, Prague 2008, ISBN 9788073190736
- Klimešová M., Roky ve dnech / Years in Days, Czech Art 1945–957, 424 p., Prague City Gallery 2010, ISBN 978-80-87164-35-8
- Klimešová M, Greetings to a distant land, greetings from a distant land: Zbyněk Sekal and Japan, 128 p., Arbor vitae, Řevnice 2014, ISBN 978-80-86415-97-0
