= Pavel Baudiš =

Czech software engineer and entrepreneur

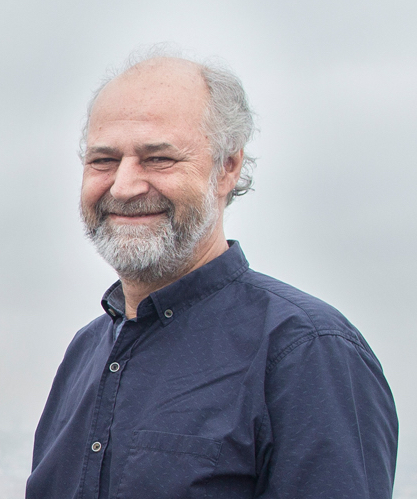
- Baudiš in 2016
- Born: May 1960 (age 66)
- Education: Prague University of Chemical Technology
- Occupation: Businessman
- Known for: Co-founder of Avast
- Children: 2

Pavel Baudiš (born May 1960)is a Czech software engineer, entrepreneur and the co-founder of Avast along with Eduard Kučera. He became the largest Gen Digital individual or non-institutional shareholder. As of 2024, he is the 8th wealthiest person in the Czech Republic, with a net worth of more than $2.3 billion according to Forbes.

== Biography ==
Baudiš was born in Prague and studied information technology at the University of Chemistry and Technology, Prague. He subsequently worked as a graphics specialist at the Research Institute of Mathematical Machines (VÚMS).

In 1988, while working at VÚMS, Baudiš encountered the Vienna virus on a floppy disk and developed a program to detect and remove it. The program became a key component of the first Avast antivirus engine. He subsequently worked with his colleague Eduard Kučera on developing and distributing antivirus software. Baudiš and Kučera established the ALWIL Software partnership in 1991, following the fall of communism in Czechoslovakia.

In 2001, ALWIL began offering Avast antivirus software free to home users, a strategy that helped expand its international user base. Avast reached one million users in 2003 and 20 million by 2006. ALWIL Software was renamed Avast Software in 2010, taking the name of its best-known product.

Avast was listed on the London Stock Exchange in May 2018 at a valuation of $3.23 billion. At the time, it was the largest technology IPO in Europe that year and one of the five largest technology IPOs in the history of the London Stock Exchange.

In September 2022, NortonLifeLock completed its acquisition of Avast, and Baudiš joined the NortonLifeLock board as an independent director. The company was renamed Gen Digital in November 2022.

== Investments ==
After Avast became successful, Baudiš began investing in other Czech businesses. Together with Eduard Kučera he invested through the R2G group, including in companies such as Rohlik Group.

He also invested in the redevelopment of Prague's former InterContinental hotel into the Fairmont Golden Prague, and in 2025 became the majority owner of the company that owns the hotel.

== Philanthropy ==
Baudiš has supported charitable causes since the 2000s, initially together with his wife Jarmila and later through the Avast Foundation.

In 2020, Baudiš, Eduard Kučera and their wives established the Abakus foundation, which is focused on palliative care and support for people with disabilities. By 2025, it had distributed nearly CZK 400 million.
