= Pařížská =

Street in Prague, Czech Republic

Pařížská is a street located in the Old Town and Josefov districts of Prague, Czech Republic. It connects Old Town Square with the square Náměstí Curieových. The buildings along the street feature distinctive façades incorporating various stylistic elements of Eclecticism and Art Nouveau. Pařížská is part of the "Historic Centre of Prague" heritage zone, a UNESCO World Heritage Site. It has long been one of the most expensive streets in Central and Eastern Europe; in 2022 and 2023, it surpassed Na Příkopě street, becoming the most expensive street in the Czech Republic. Luxury brands on the street include Christian Louboutin, Yves Saint Laurent, Chloé, Lanvin, Balenciaga, Givenchy, and Balmain. Its name means 'Paris street'.
