= Eduard Kučera =

Czech software engineer and entrepreneur

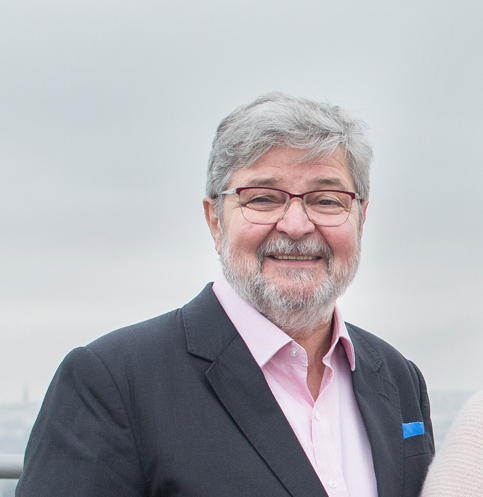
- Born: 11 January 1953 (age 73)
- Education: Charles University
- Known for: Co-founder of Avast
- Spouse: Milada Kučerová

Eduard Kučera (born 11 January 1953) is a Czech software engineer and entrepreneur, best known as a co-founder of the cybersecurity company Avast with Pavel Baudiš. He studied physical electronics at Charles University and later worked at the Research Institute of Mathematical Machines. Kučera was chief executive of Avast's predecessor, Alwil Software, from 1991 to 2009 and as chairman of Avast from 2006 to 2014.

== Early life and career ==
Kučera studied physical electronics at the Faculty of Mathematics and Physics of Charles University. He subsequently worked at the Research Institute of Mathematical Machines (VÚMS) in Prague, where he was involved in the development of printers and worked together with Pavel Baudiš.

In 1988, Kučera and Baudiš began a computer business after Baudiš developed software to remove the Vienna virus. They subsequently established Alwil Software, the predecessor of Avast, and Kučera became responsible for its operations in 1991.

== Avast ==
As chief executive officer, Kučera oversaw the day-to-day operations of Alwil Software and its development into Avast. In 2002, he directed the company's transition to a free software distribution model, offering its antivirus software free to consumers while generating revenue from paid products and features. The approach became central to Avast's freemium business model and subsequent international growth.

Kučera was succeeded as chief executive by Vince Steckler in 2009 and continued as chairman of the board. Summit Partners acquired a minority stake in the company in 2010, followed by CVC Capital Partners in 2014. The latter investment ended the founders' majority ownership and coincided with their withdrawal from executive management. Kučera stepped down as chairman in 2014 and was succeeded by John Schwarz, while Kučera and Baudiš remained the company's largest shareholders.

Kučera continued to hold a substantial stake in Avast after leaving its management. At the time of the company's initial public offering on the London Stock Exchange in 2018, Kučera and Baudiš together owned 46 percent of Avast; the offering valued the company at approximately £2.4 billion. Following Avast's acquisition by NortonLifeLock in 2022, Kučera retained a stake in the combined company, which was renamed Gen Digital.

== Awards and recognition ==
Kučera was named Czech EY Entrepreneur of the Year in 2009 for his work at Alwil Software. In 2013, he and Pavel Baudiš received the TOP Responsible Leader award for their philanthropic activities through the Avast Foundation.

In 2022, Kučera and his wife, Milada Kučerová, received a Czech Lion for an exceptional contribution to the audiovisual field, recognizing their support for the digital restoration of Czech films.

== Investments and philanthropy ==
After leaving the management of Avast, Kučera became active as an investor. He has invested through R2G and in several venture capital funds, including Credo Ventures, Rockaway Capital and Evolution Equity. His investments have ranged from technology companies to industrial and real-estate assets.

Kučera and Pavel Baudiš founded the Avast Foundation in 2010 to support charitable projects in the Czech Republic.
