= Stanislav Podhrázský =

Czech painter, sculptor and restorer

- Born: 10 November 1920; Pejhov, Czechoslovakia
- Died: 20 May 1999 (aged 78); Prague, Czech Republic
- Education: Academy of Applied Arts
- Occupations: sculptor, painter, restorer
- Movement: Umělecká beseda, Máj 57

Stanislav Podhrázský (10 November 1920 – 20 May 1999) was a Czech painter, sculptor and restorer. He is one of the outstanding figuralists of Czech painting of the second half of the 20th century.

== Life ==
Stanislav Podhrázský was born in the family of a master bricklayer in Pejhov (now Pýchov, an integral part of Nová Včelnice). He trained as a room painter in the painting school of the Viennese decorator Emil Dvířka. In 1936 he went to Prague and continued his apprenticeship at the Černý firm in Žižkov. He lived in the family of the legionary Novák, where he painted his first portraits; he was an amateur boxer. In 1942–1944 he attended the carving specialty of Professor František Kment at the State Central School of Housing Industry in Prague, Žižkov.

In 1945 he was admitted to the Academy of Arts, Architecture and Design in Prague in the studio of Prof. František Tichý. His classmates were Zbyněk Sekal, Josef Lehoučka and from 1947 also Mikuláš Medek. Until 1949, he had the opportunity to attend lectures by Prof. Václav Nebeský, an important theoretician of Czech and French modern art, a member of the Tvrdošíjní group. Mikuláš Medek, influenced by interwar surrealism and familiar with the Minotaure, brought the impulses of surrealism to his classmates as well. During his studies, Podhrázský was in contact with the Surrealists of Spořilov, including his classmate Libor Fára. He moved to Tomášská Street in the Malá Strana, where he lived until 1990.

After the 1948 Czechoslovak coup d'état, Miloslav Chlupáč and Mikuláš Medek were expelled from the Academy. He finished his studies with the defence of his thesis The Great Act in 1950, but like Zbyněk Sekal he left the school without passing the final state examination, as he was unable to meet the new communist ideological demands. In his psychological distress he attacked a policeman and was hospitalized in a psychiatric hospital in Dobřany, where he was submitted to electric shocks. He was released from the hospital when Miloslav Chlupáč vouched for him. Between 1951 and 1953, due to mental illness, he hardly created at all and destroyed many of his surrealist sculptures and paintings from the time of his studies, which had too poignant a personal meaning and threatened him with their intensity.

Due to Podhrázský's experience with the masonry craft, Josef Wagner invited him to participate in his restoration commissions. From 1952 he worked as a fresco restorer, first in Fričovce, Slovakia (with Zdeněk Palcr and Miloslav Chlupáč), and later in Strakonice, Písek and Klatovy (1955-1956, with Zdeněk Palcr and Mikuláš Medek). He returned to free creative work in 1955.

In 1956, he married Olga Milotová and through her employment in the advertising firm Rapid, he was able to obtain foreign publications on art and painters of the Renaissance and Mannerism. The following year his daughter Jana (Jana Chytilová) was born, but the marriage broke up shortly afterwards.

He was briefly a member of the Umělecká beseda and from 1957 a member of the group May 57, with which he exhibited until its dissolution in 1964. He had his first solo exhibition (together with sculptor Zdeněk Palcr) at the Aleš Hall of Umělecká beseda in Prague (1960).

In 1963, together with Zbyněk Sekal, he took part in a tour of the Artistˇs Union to the Leningrad Hermitage and at the same time became close to Jaroslava Červená, who married him in 1968. In 1963-1973, he spent summers with other artists (V. Kiml, J. Jíra, M. Preclík) at the Nezabudický mill on the Berounka River and often visited his birthplace.

Since the mid-1960s he had several solo exhibitions in Prague (1966, 1969), Brno (1966), Hradec Králové, Cheb (1969), Karlovy Vary (1971) and Litoměřice (1972). In 1968 he made his only trip to Italy (Venice, Ravenna, Florence).

With the beginning of normalization, he was forced to resume restoration for existential reasons and from 1974 to 1987 he worked in a team of restorers led by Olbram Zoubek (Z. Palcr, V. Boštík, etc.) at Litomyšl Castle. Litomyšl became important centre of unofficial culture, which included, for example, the philosopher Petr Rezek or the writer Libuše Moníková, whose stay in Litomyšl inspired her to write the novel Facade.

In 1981, the Centre Georges Pompidou in Paris purchased four drawings by Podhrázský on the initiative of art historians Jana Tvrzníková (married Claverie) and František Šmejkal.

In the seventies and eighties he was not allowed to exhibit solo. The only exception is the exhibition at the Municipal Cultural Centre in Dobříš, prepared by Vladimíra Eidernová-Koubová and Marie Klimešová in January 1982. The vernissage became a cultural event, attended among others by the theoretician Jindřich Chalupecký and the director of the National Gallery Jiří Kotalík.

In 1990 Podhrázský had to leave his studio and apartment in the Malá Strana and moved with his wife Jaroslava to a tenement house in Vyšehrad. In the first years he still painted smaller formats there, but the cramped space did not satisfy his need for freedom, which he absolutely required to create, and from the mid-1990s he did not paint anymore.

== Work ==
In František Tichý's studio there were strict requirements for mastery of drawing and volume according to the model, and the inclination of many of his students towards surrealism can be explained by the overpressure of aggression, which they vented on personal and social traumas from the war and the following Communist coup of 1948. The work of the young generation of Surrealists after 1945 thus had little in common with the original Surrealist programme. The earliest drawing of a nude from 1946, which stands out from the rest of the work, reveals Podhrázský's influence on Czech poetism At the beginning of his studies, Podhrázský understood drawing in an almost hypersensitive way, as a dangerous activity that could harm a person.

He identified with the process of creation to the extent that he perceived it not only as a search for truth, but as a question of life and death. The introduction to surrealism had a dramatic effect on Podhrázský's hypersensitive nature and offered him creative freedom. His work from that time has an intuitive to mediumistic character and is characterized by a painterly culture.

The need to create a magical inner space in his work was related to the psychophysical need of the author. The numerous references to Mannerism in Podhrázský's paintings are related to his strong perception of the genius loci in his place of residence in the Lesser Town, where he "felt the presence of the Rudolphine painters from the nearby Jánský vrch and Vlašská Street", as well as his long direct experience with the restoration of Renaissance sgraffiti at the castle in Litomyšl

=== Sculptures ===
In 1947-1948, sculptures strongly influenced by surrealism were created - Nun (plaster, destroyed) and the hallucinatory anxious vision Jeníček' (plaster, National Gallery in Prague), which have no parallel in the sculptural work of the time and are considered a distinctive value of Czech post-war surrealism. The sculptures Coat (1948) and Ashtray (1948) also have a Surrealist background. The sculpture Legs (1948) was created as a working model for drawing studies of girl figures.

In the 1960s, when Podhrázský was influenced by the morphology of sculptures by M. Chlupáč and Z. Palcr, he briefly returned to sculpture. His Standing Torso (1964) is an assemblage of abstract elements, while Two Heads (1964), referring to the now missing sculpture Head from 1948, represents the theme of precariousness and stopping in motion. Torso from 1965 is an expression of existential distress - a delicately modelled girl figure is topped with a box as a symbol of psychological shelter, which turns the sculpture into an object. Podhrázský's own variant on seated figures by Palcr from the late 1950s (Seated Figure, 1968) is composed of a set of modelled boulders and relates to the work of Henry Moore. The schematically austere sculpture The Swordsman (1964, GVU Náchod) was probably created as a free model for the male figure from the painting The Couple (1965)

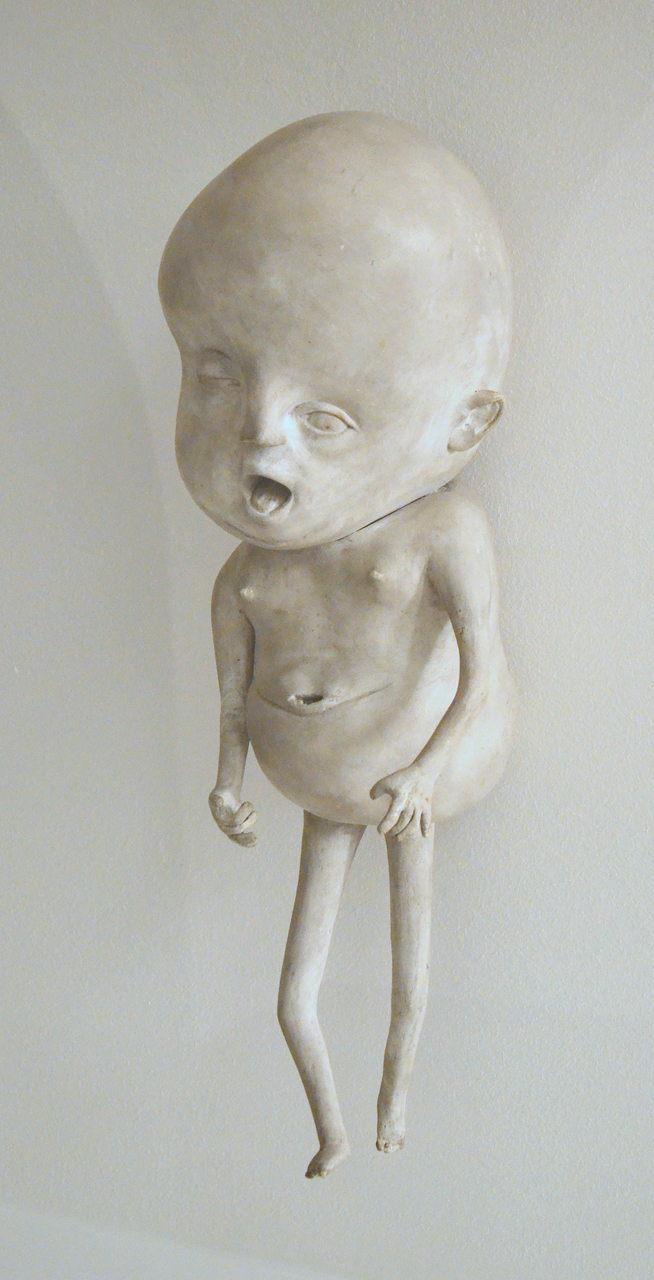
Jeníček (1948), plaster, National Gallery Prague

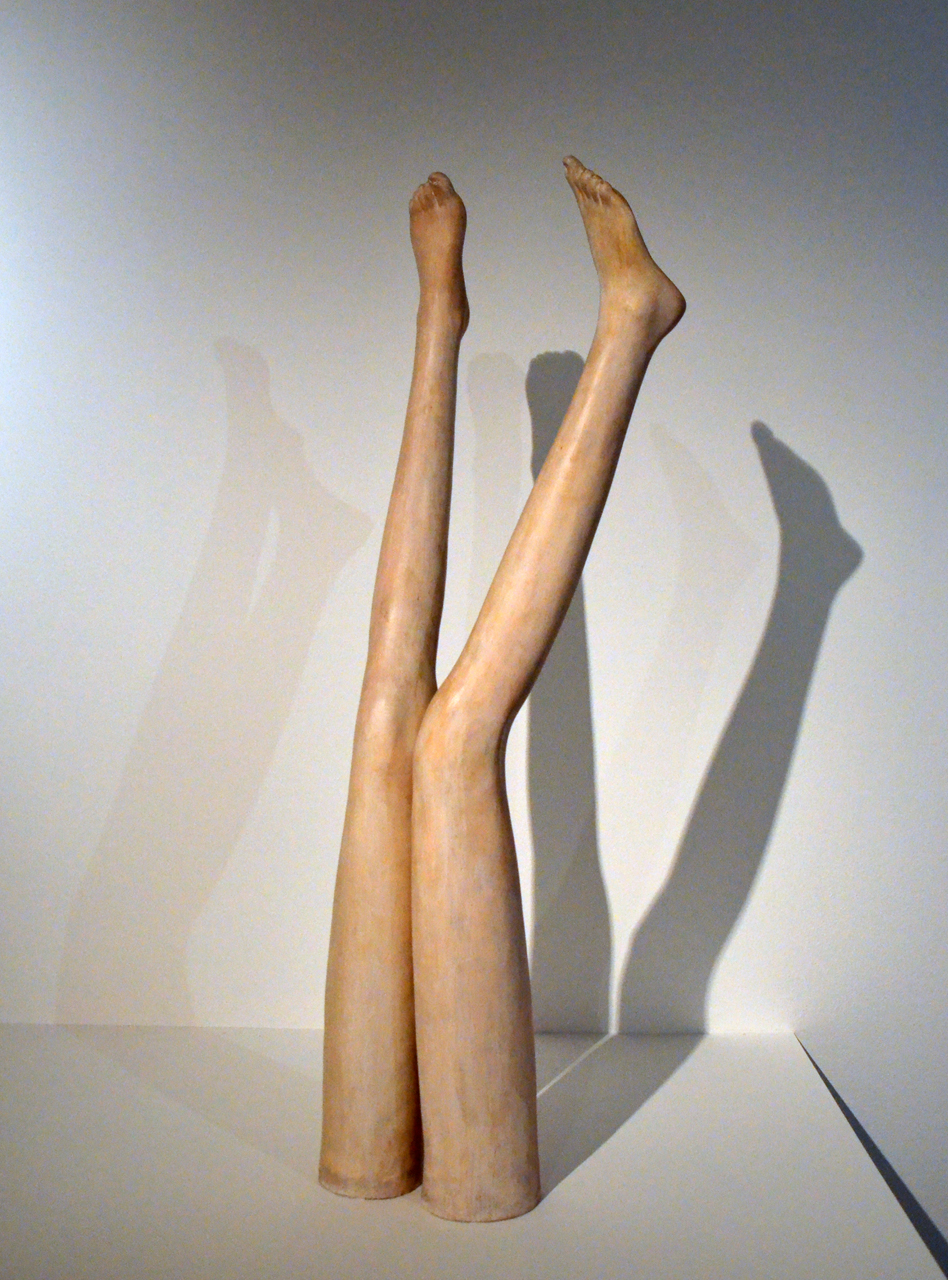
Legs (1948), patinated plaster

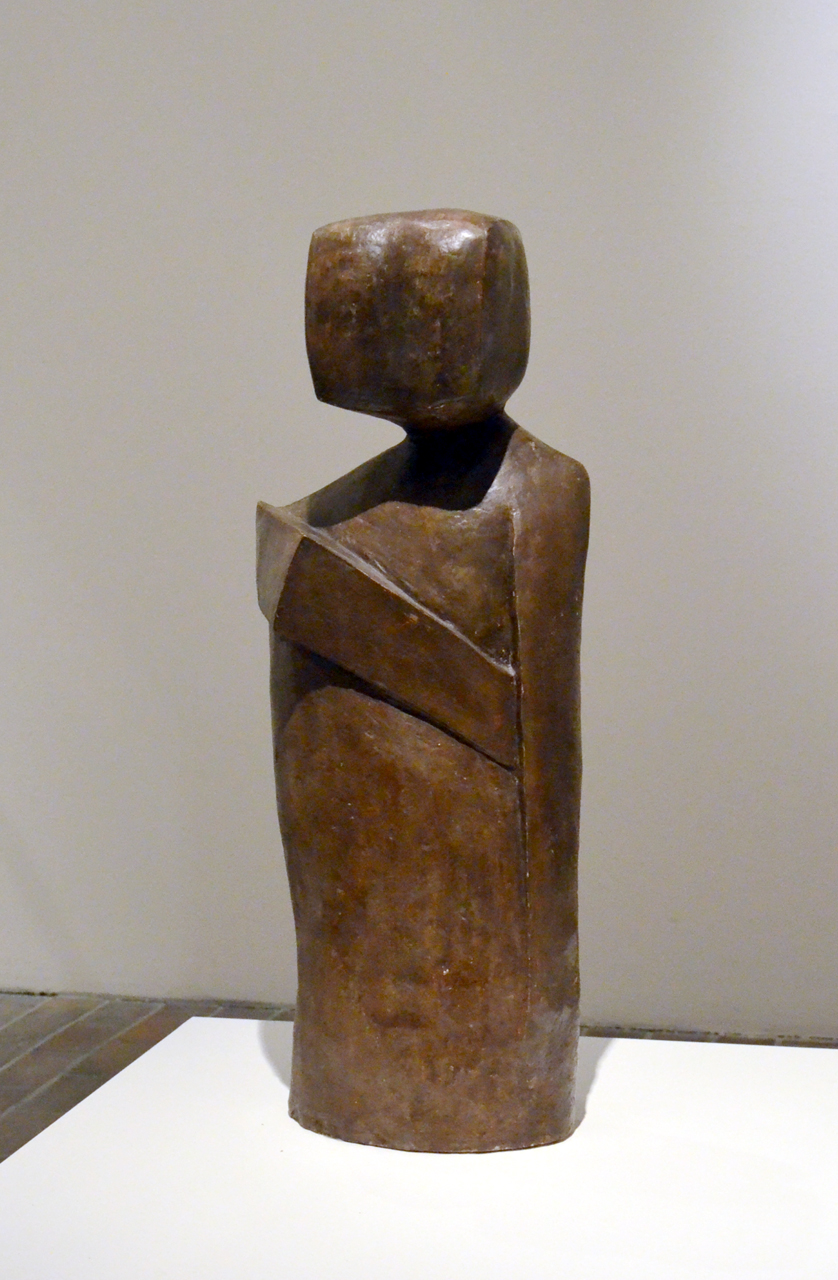
Fencer (1964), Gallery of Fine Arts Náchod

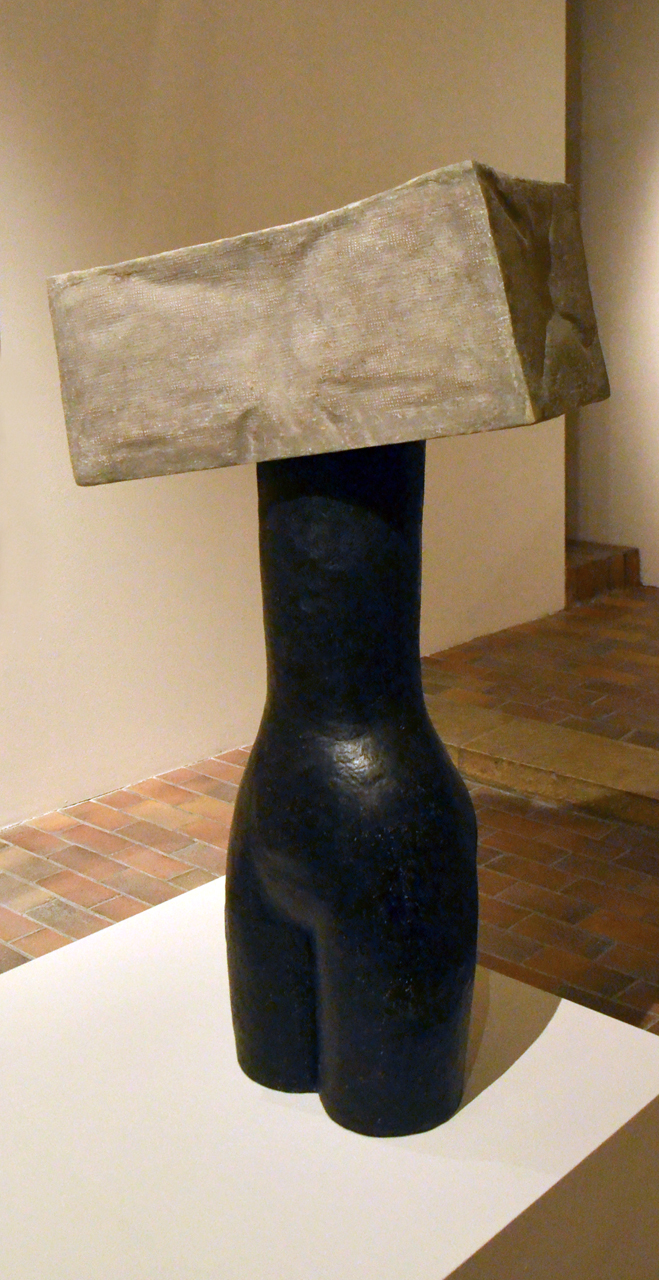
Torso (1965)

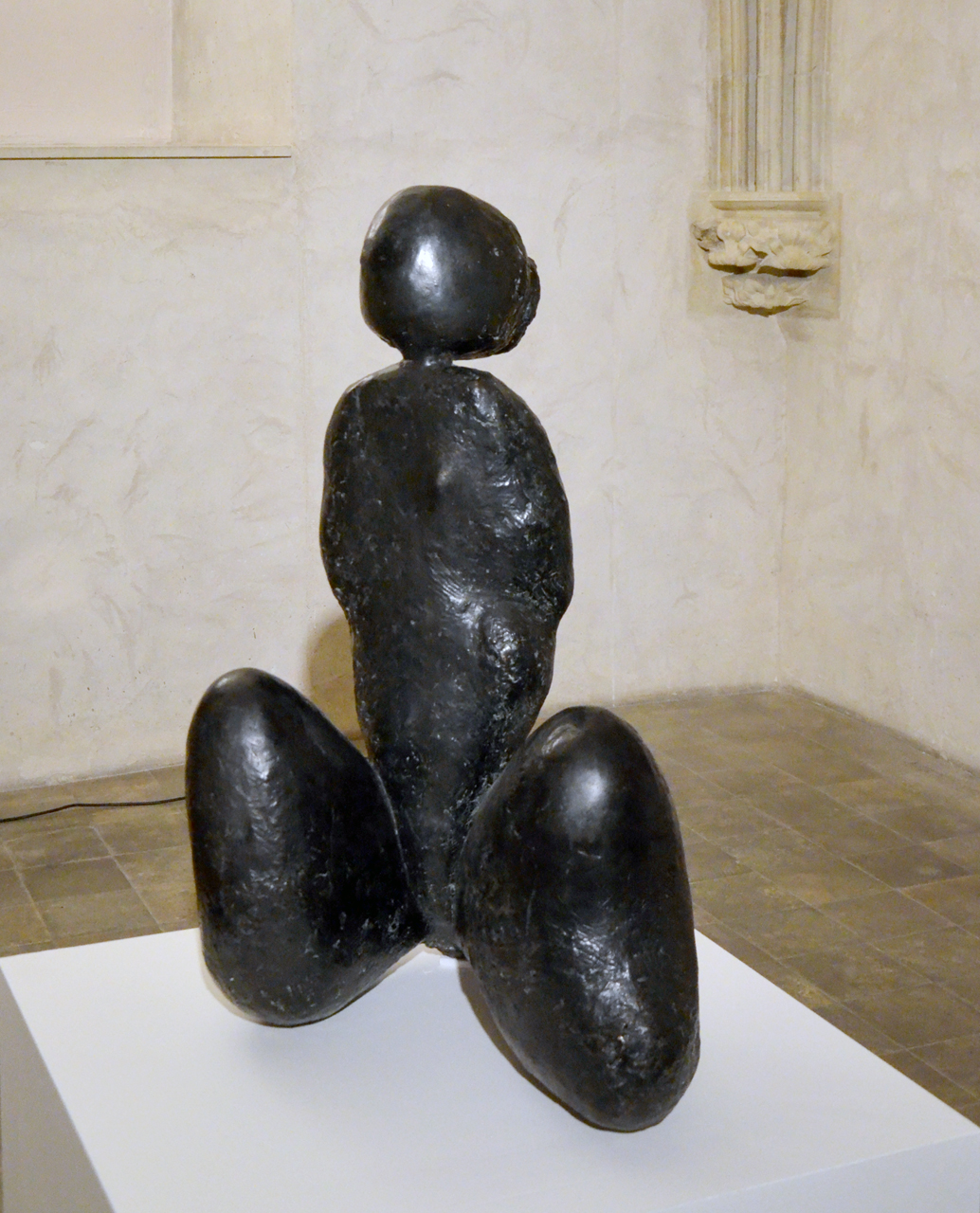
Seating Figure (1968)

=== Drawings and paintings ===
Stanislav Podhrázský is known primarily as a masterful draughtsman and painter. In the late 1940s, like many members of his generation (Medek, Sekal, Fára), he was influenced by Surrealism. This period was relatively short, because the frightening personal experience of exploring his own subconsciousness discouraged the author from further experiments. The most important works of this period are Head in the Mould (1948) and Imaginations of Fear (1949), a reflection on generational feeling. The painting is an aggressive metaphor of the terrible time after the 1948 Czechoslovak coup d'état Among the technical discoveries of the Surrealists, he uses grattage or decal in his work on the picture surface.

Already during his studies, he created the stylized Nude (1946), which is particularly notable for its luminous modelling of charcoal drawing. His graduation work was a slightly larger-than-life charcoal drawing, Large Study of the Nude (1950). His later large-scale drawings are also mostly studies of girls' figures, faces and hands. The charcoal drawing is sometimes combined with pastel (Drawing III, 1956).

In his drawings and paintings from the mid-1950s, when he returned to free work, he uses more formal attributes of surrealist painting - undefined space without perspective with mysterious objects, the motif of expansive body cavities and vegetation surrounding the girl figures (Girl at the Table, 1956, Drawing III, 1956). The surrealistic mythologization of reality in the recurring motif of the broken jug symbolizes the transition to adulthood and the loss of innocence (Broken Jug, 1956). Podhrázský may have been influenced by Heinrich von Kleist's then-published play Rozbitý džbán (Orbis, Prague 1954), in which a guilty man investigates a crime he himself has committed. The motif illustrates well the hypocrisy of the communist nomenklatura of the time. Two monumental pastels with the motif of a broken jug from 1956 could have been Podhrázský's competition designs for the new building of the Biophysical Institute of the Czechoslovak Academy of Sciences in Brno (1957).

Podhrázský's paintings have a complicated content, combining personal and generally valid meanings. In the charcoal and pastel drawing Broken Jug (1956), the already broken jug at the girl's feet opens up a world of knowledge and desire, symbolized by the large orchid flower above her head and the massive vertical of a tree with thorns. Another motif of the drawings was the theme of touch and physical intimacy of figurative couples - lovers or a mother with a child on her lap (Lovers, 1956, Motherhood, 1956). In the period from the 1950s to the mid-1960s Podhrázský produced a large number of charcoal drawings on wrapping paper, which formed a kind of sampler of motifs and often had a perfect definitive execution. Some studies suggest inspiration from the fantasy world of Hieronymus Bosch, others existential awe or erotically tinged aggression. In the drawing Girls with Flowers (1958), a woman's body undergoes a metamorphosis into a flower (or vice versa). Three drawings from this set were selected for purchase by the Centre Pompidou in Paris in the early 1980s (Girl and Flower, 1955, Screaming Girl, before 1959, Legs, late 1950s).

In 1957-1959, he made a series of charcoal drawings of girls' semi-nudes. Some of these draw on his previous surrealist work and are characterised by deformations of physiognomy with hypertrophied body features and a taut, challenging physicality. Their carnality as a symbol of fertility and desire is archetypal in nature (Nude, 1957). The second part is sensually subtle, with elaborate hand gestures adjusting hair. They thus represent the rather lyrical emotion he was overwhelmed with in his dream. A separate element and emotional centre of the work until the 1960s were girl´s hair (Girl combing her hair, 1967. The disturbing motif of the averted figure (The Listener, 1969) refers to the imaginative context of his work

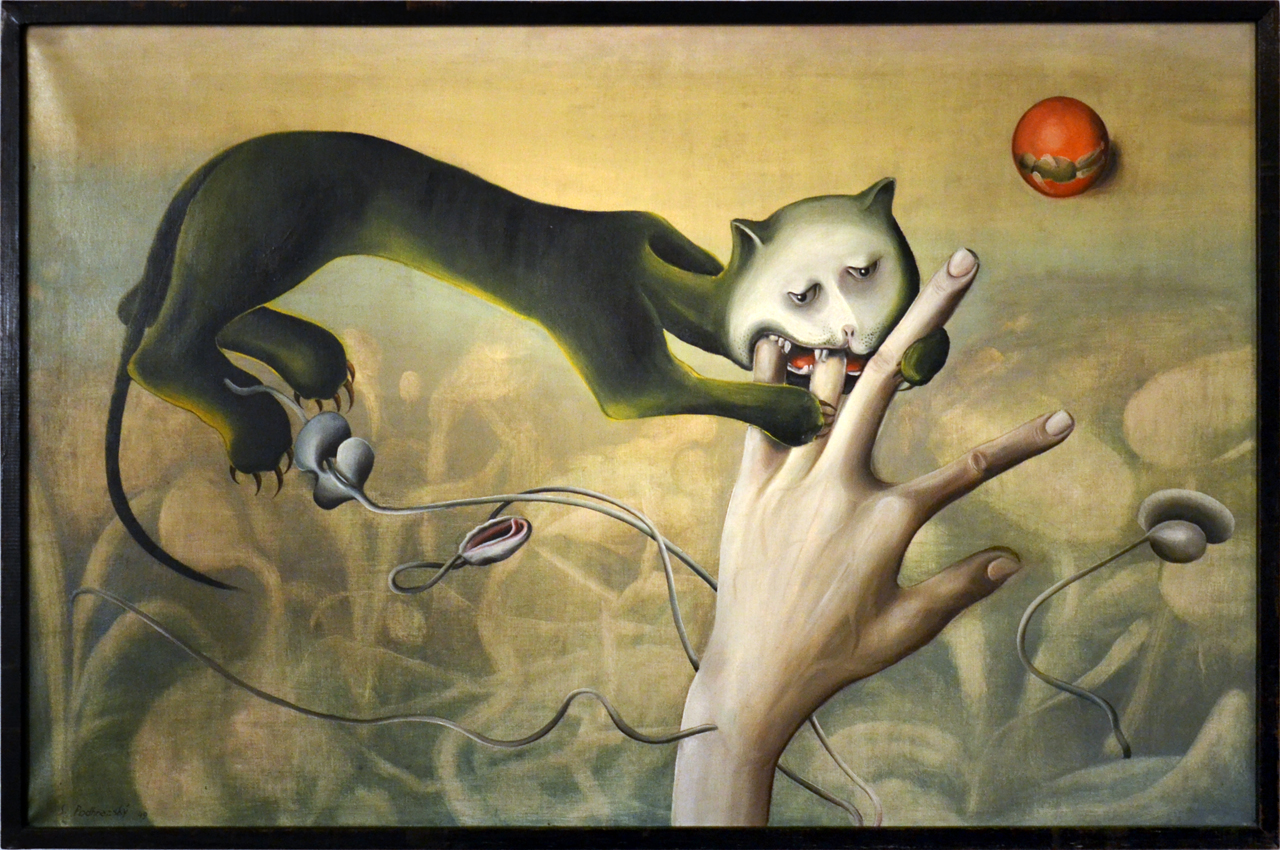
Imaginations of Fear (1949), oil, South Bohemian Gallery in Hluboká nad Vltavou

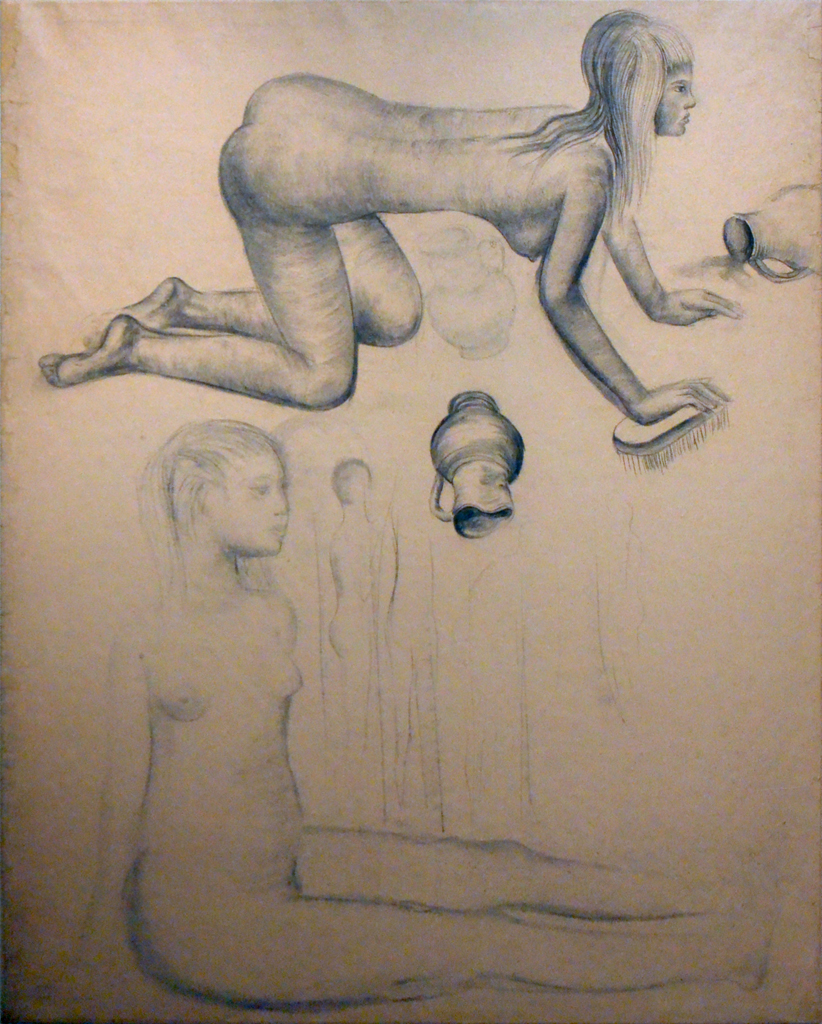
Drawing I, (1955), charcoal, Prague City Gallery

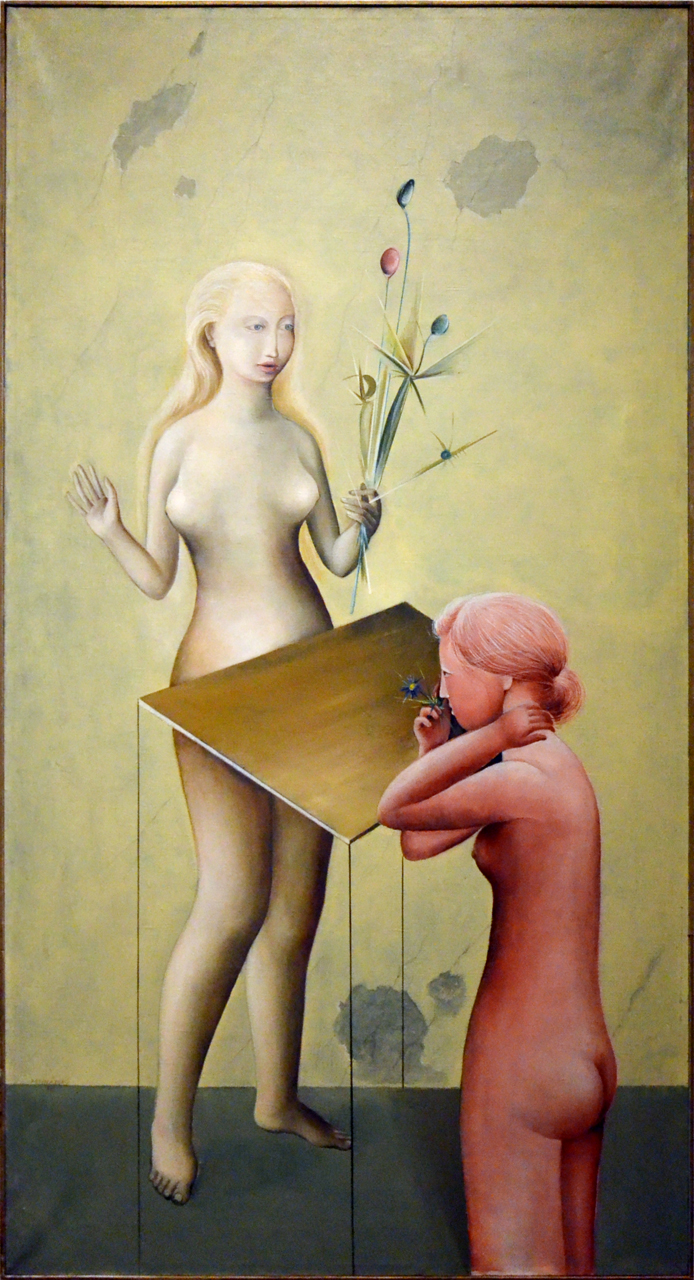
Girls at a Table (1956), oil, Gallery of Modern Art in Hradec Králové

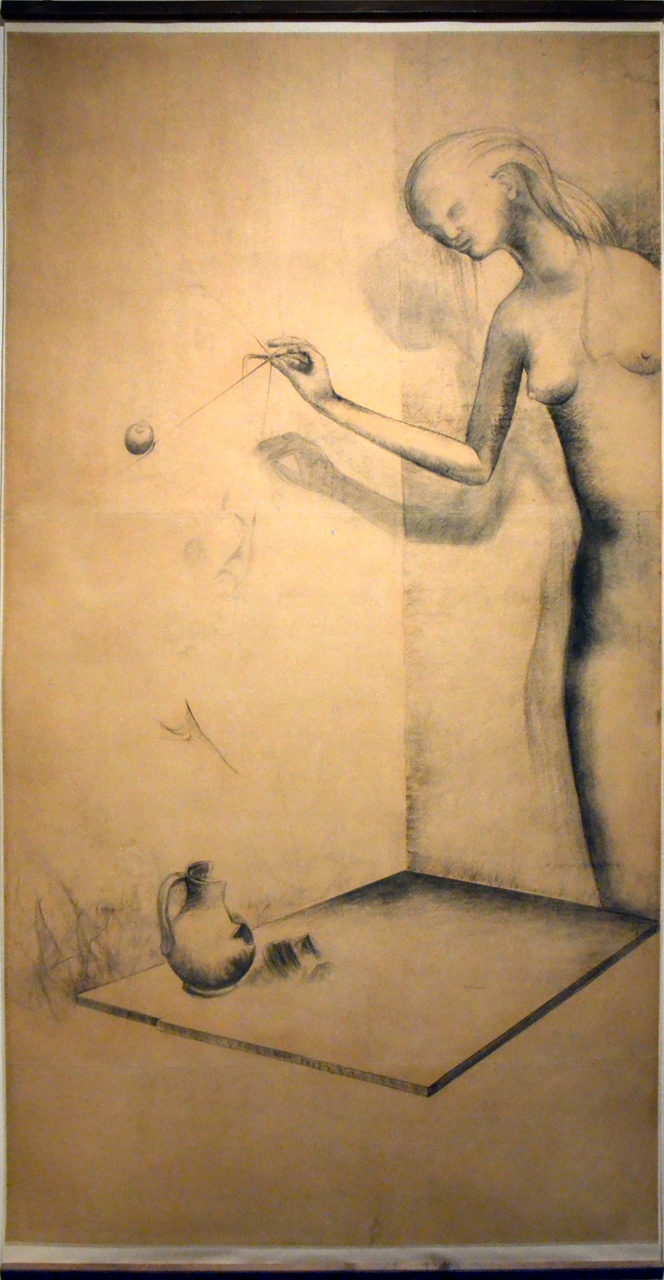
Broken Jug (1956), charcoal on paper

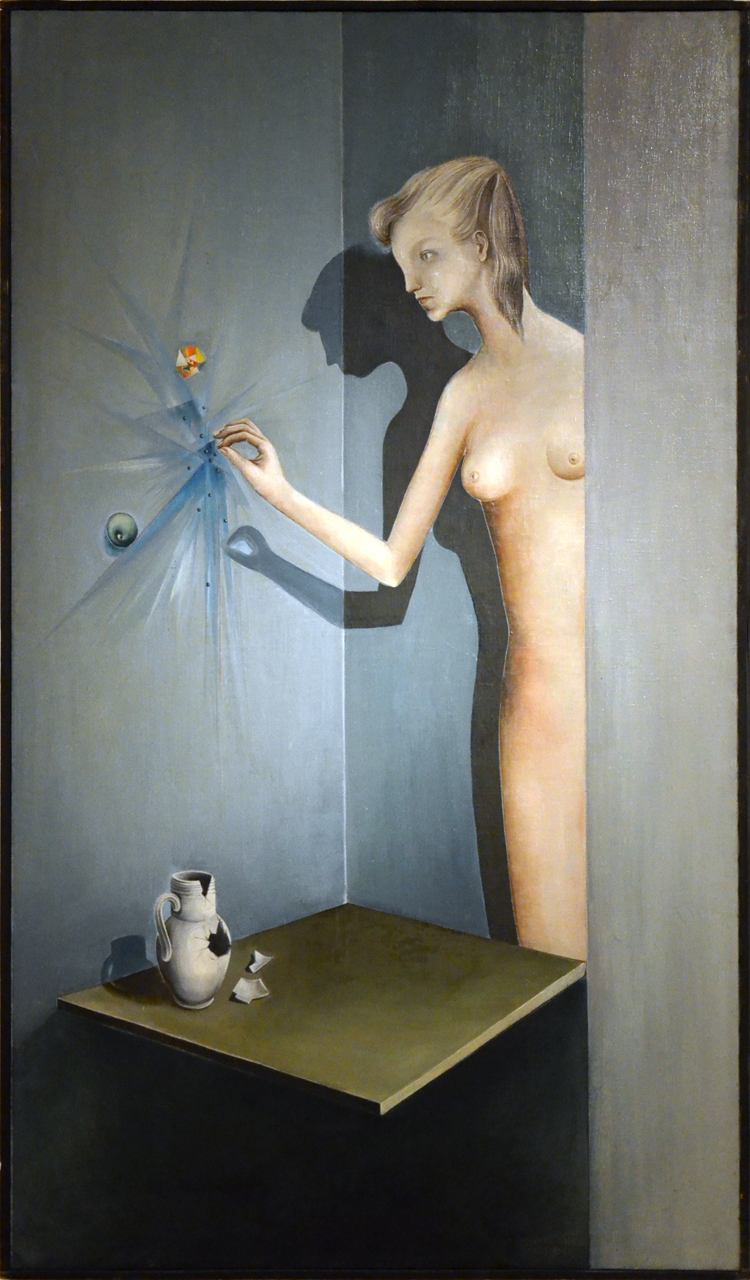
Girl at a Table (1956), oil, South Bohemian Gallery in Hluboká nad Vltavou

His figures of girls balancing between childhood and womanhood, teetering on the edge of purity and sin, show the fragile boundary between the two faces of human existence. The style of Podhrázský's paintings recalls the early Renaissance fresco of Masaccio's Expulsion (1424), from which he took pathos and a similar female type. The legacy of surrealism comes in the form of mysterious biomorphic formations and objects transposed from elsewhere, or quotations from other artists. As a variation on Medek's painting Day and Night (1956), Podhrázský probably painted his Two Girls (1956); in the painting Sunday (1957) he set Rothmayer's chairs, known from Josef Sudek's photographs, in the background; Girls in the Field (1959) repeats a motif from Millet's The Gleaners (1857). In his paintings Podhrázský uses subtle shades of colour, his modelling of figures is manneristically stylized and close to some of the artists from the pre-war Tvrdošíjní (The Hardy) group, especially Rudolf Kremlička and Jan Zrzavý. He also repeatedly returns to the theme of lovers, in which he concentrates on the sensory experience of the characters.

In the 1960s, the painter made greater use of the spatula, concentrating on the structure of the painting and often completely suppressing volume and perspective (Field, 1961; Head, 1962). Podhrázský's experimentation from the early 1960s formally departs from his previous work and approaches structural painting (Forest Interior, 1963) or combines individual elements in the form of collage (Landscape, 1960). In painting, he tries encaustic (Field, 1961) or achieves interesting effects by combining oil and synthetic enamel similar way as Mikuláš Medek (Dvojice, 1965; Jana, 1966), but soon returns to oil painting.

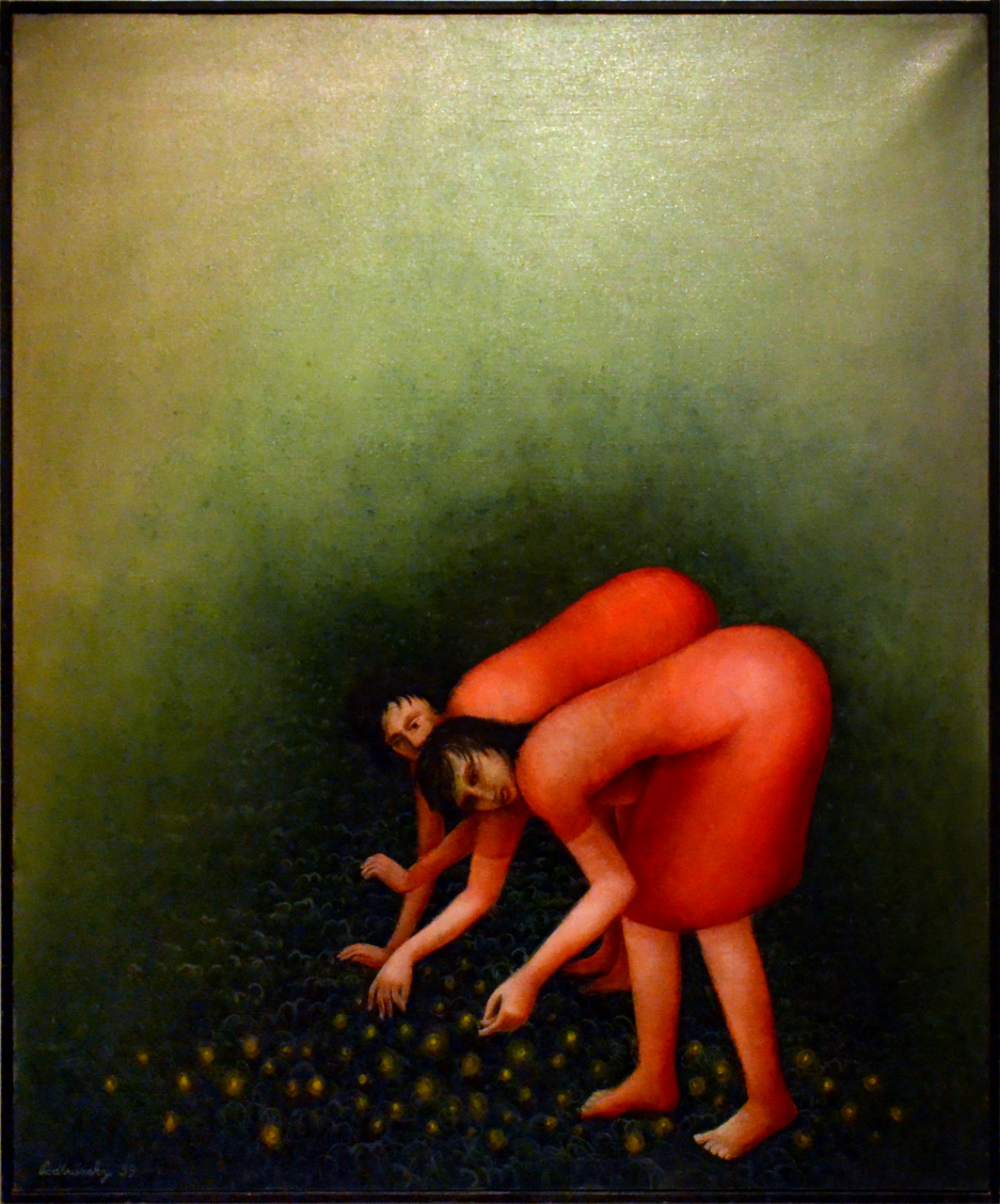
Two Girls in the Field (1959), oil

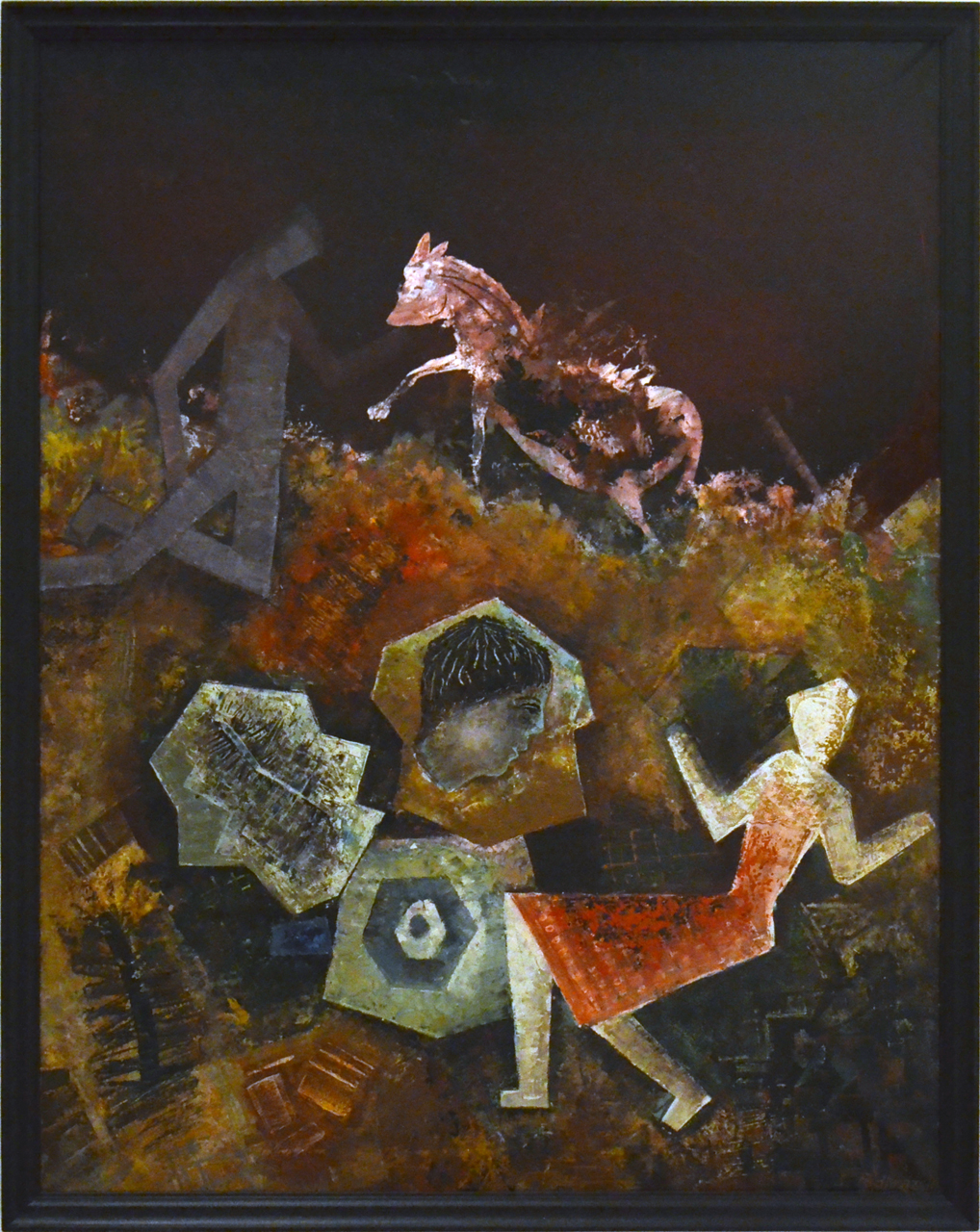
Landscape (1960), oil, Regional Gallery in Cheb

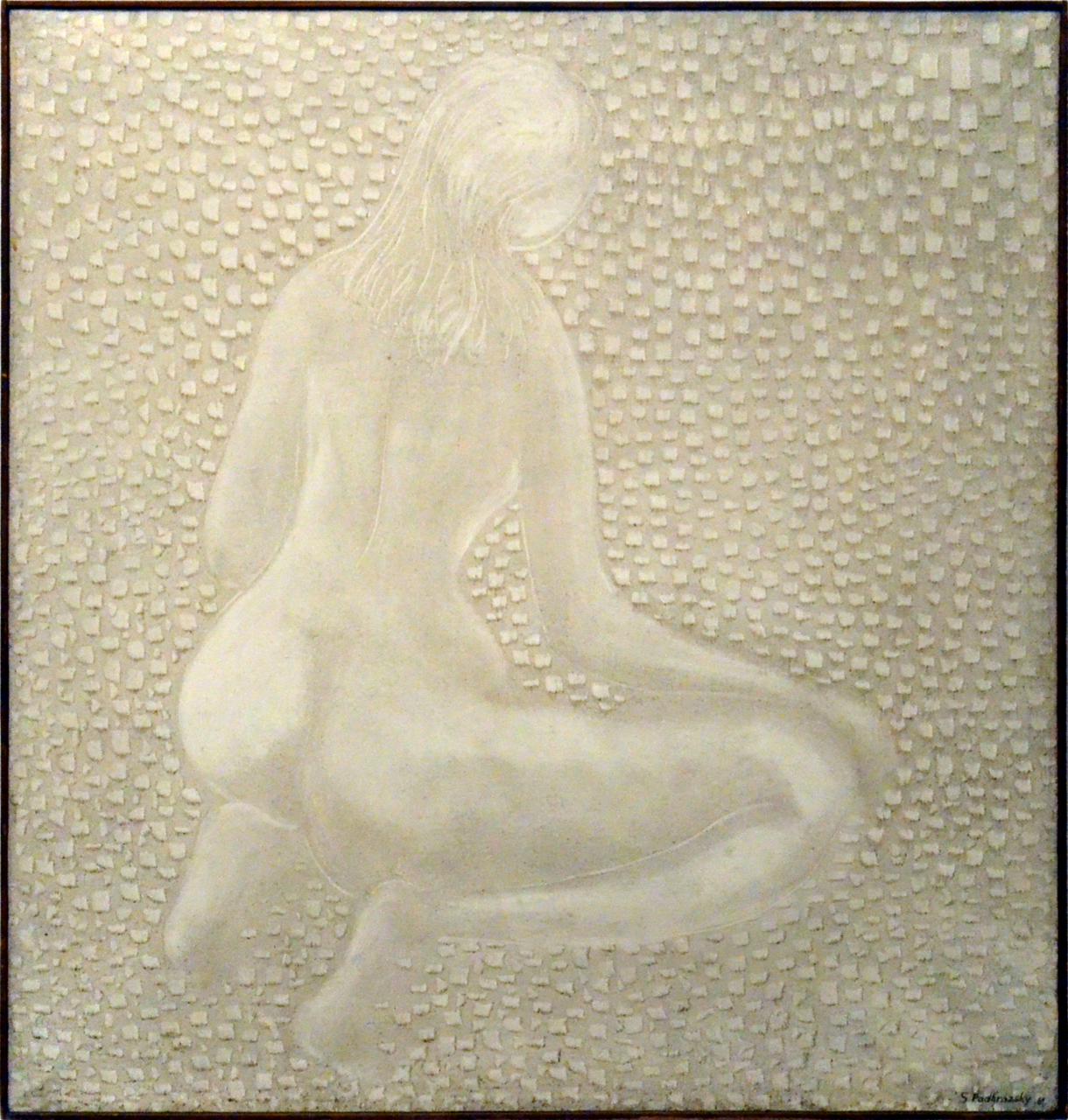
Kneeling Nude (1961), oil

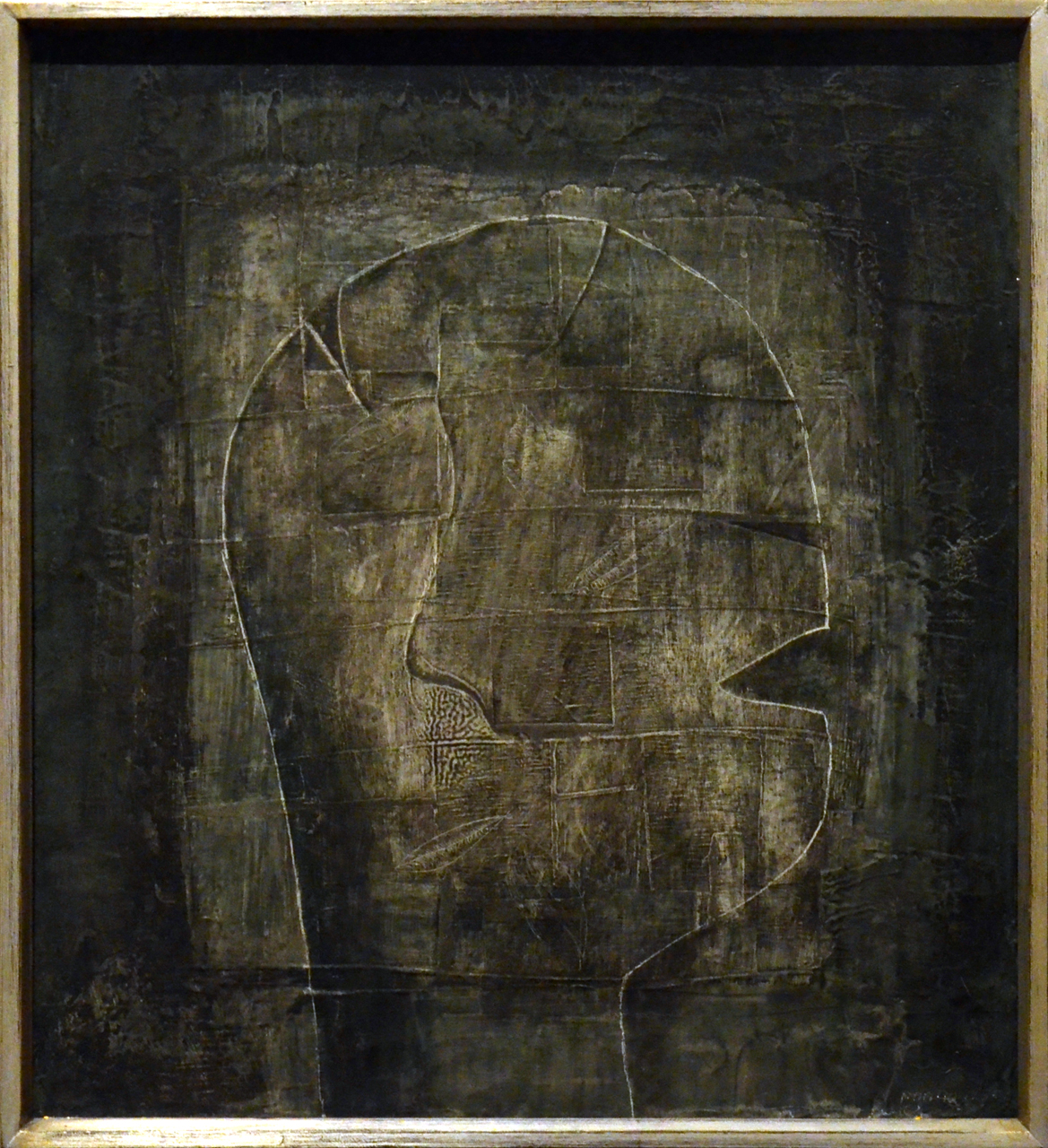
Head (1962), oil

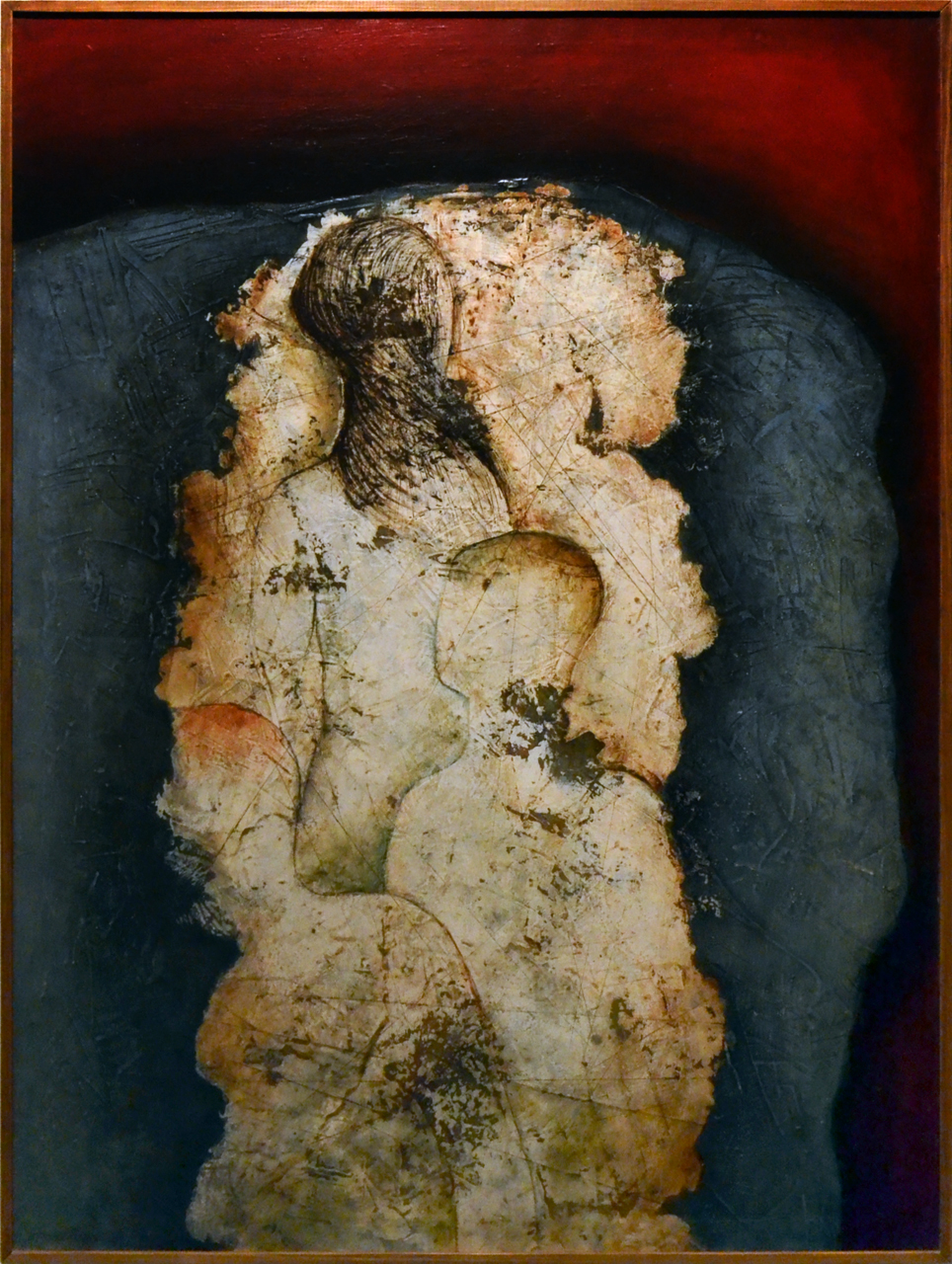
Knot (1964), oil, Gallery of Modern Art in Hradec Králové

In 1963–1964 he repeatedly returned to the figure of a woman lying in the landscape. In this group of paintings, he captures archetypal ideas of the mother - the earth, which represents a link to the earthly and the supra-earthly, and through artistic means points to the depths of the nature of human existence (Reclining nude, 1964). The painting Reclining II (1964) is a direct paraphrase of a Romanesque relief by Gislebertus (1130), depicting a reclining Eve.

In the relaxed atmosphere of the late 1960s, Podhrázský draws a series of nudes and amorous couples, but his erotic themes are not explicit and maintain chastity (Undressing, 1970). Podhrázský was virtually untouched by the wave of New Figuration of the first half of the 1960s, and he made his mark on the Czech scene as a solitaire artist with his adherence to the classical conception of beauty and the emotional intensity of Renaissance art. The central theme of his paintings in the 1970s remained the human being, often his closest family (Jarmila, 1960, Jana with Jugs, 1965). He placed his figures in abstract landscapes lacking depth, which are themselves a metaphor for the curves of the human body or the vegetation unfolding into the depths of human eroticism (Lovers, 1969).

In the 1970s and 1980s, animals often appear in the paintings. Some of the motifs of the paintings are directly related to Podhrázský's drawings for the facade of the Litomyšl Castle (Girl with a Horse, 1976).

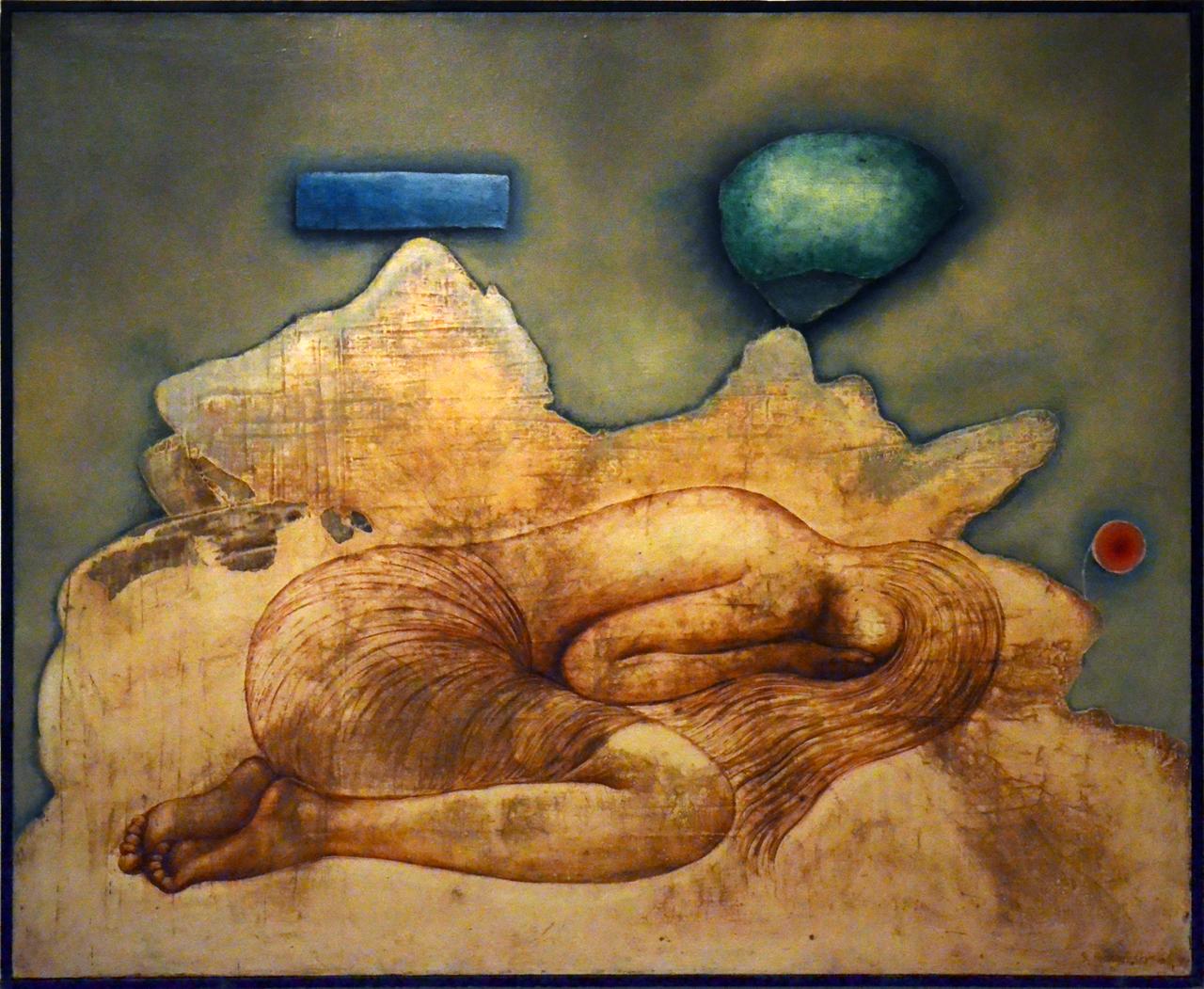
Reclining nude (1964), oil, enamel, National Gallery Prague

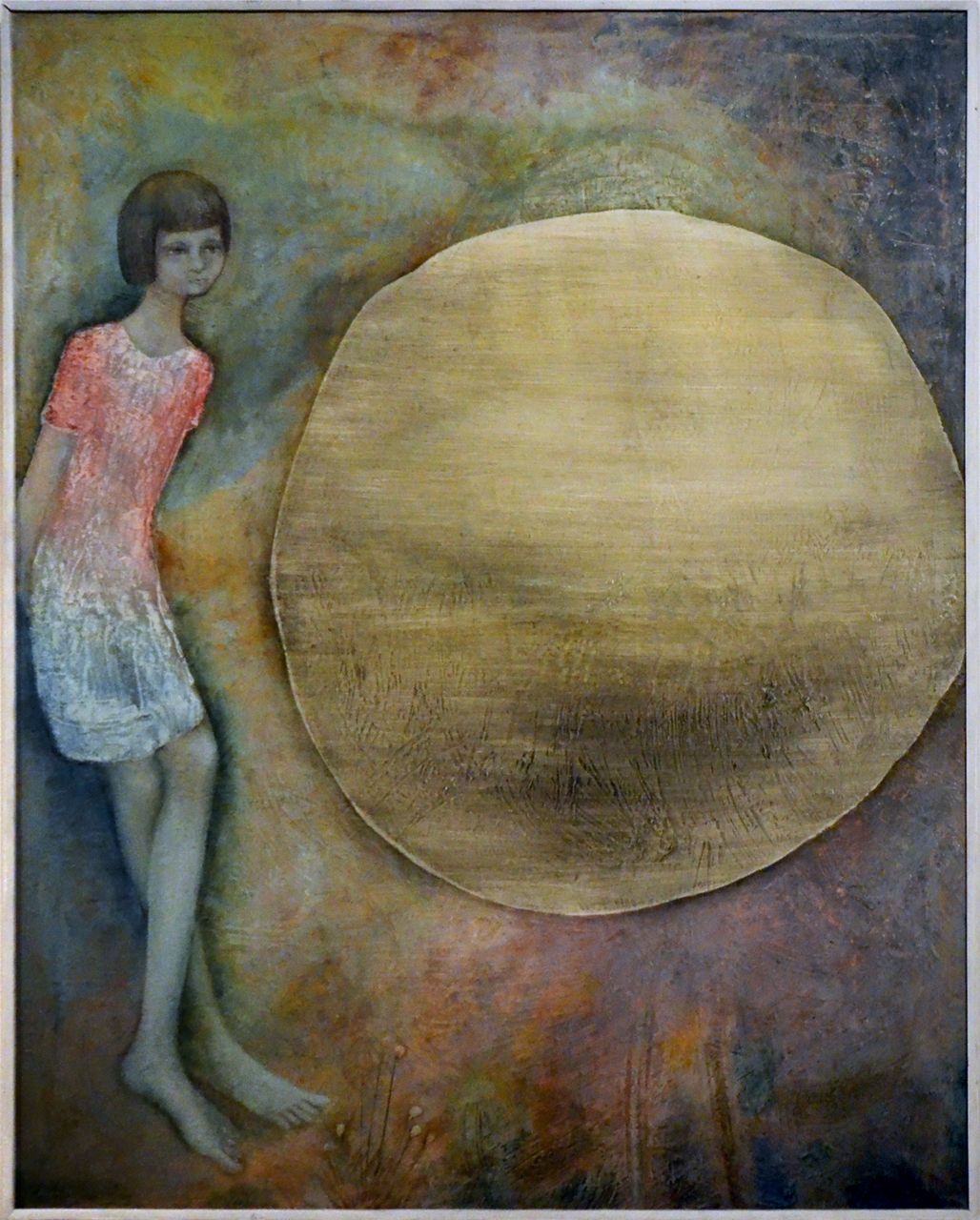
Jana (1966), oil

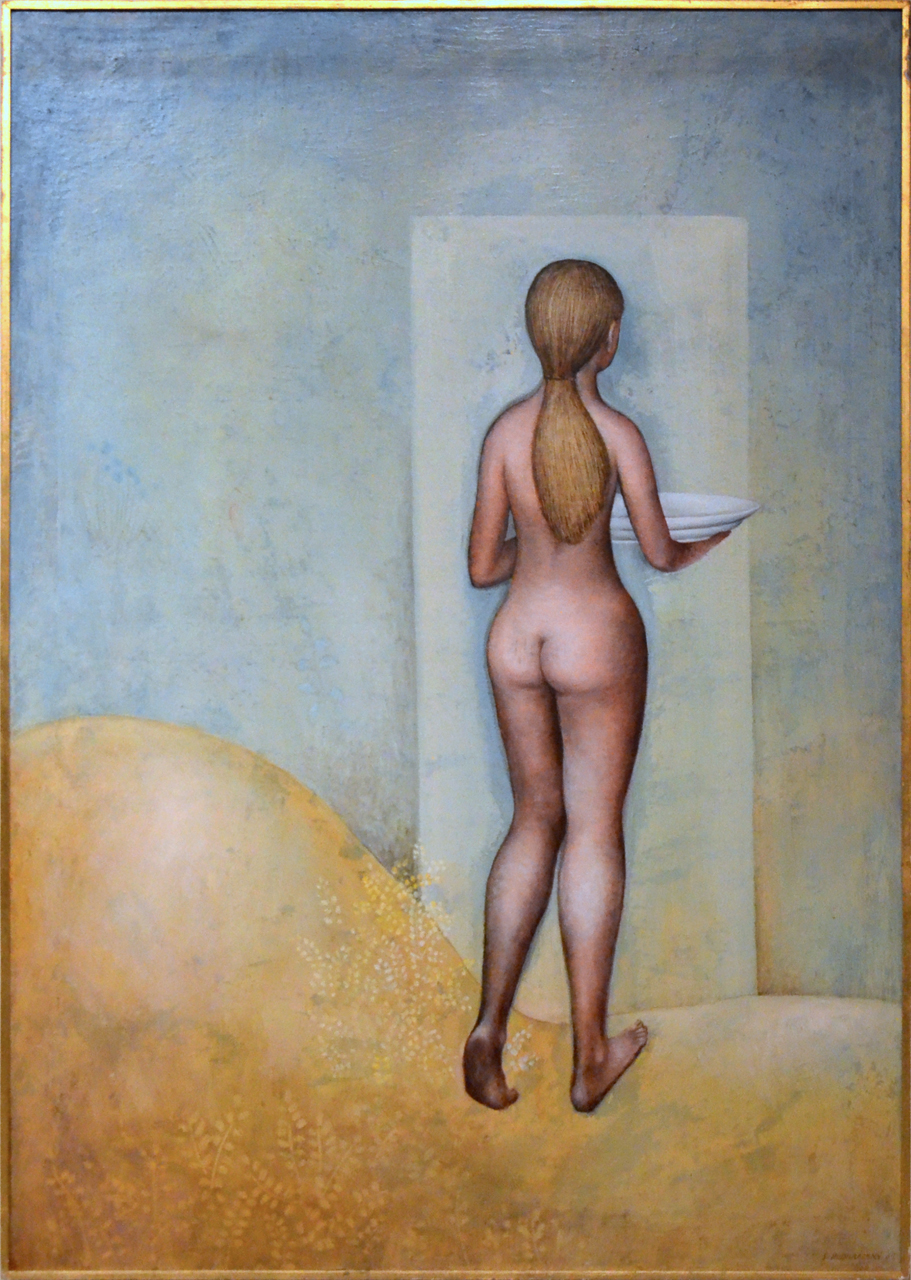
Listener (1969), oil

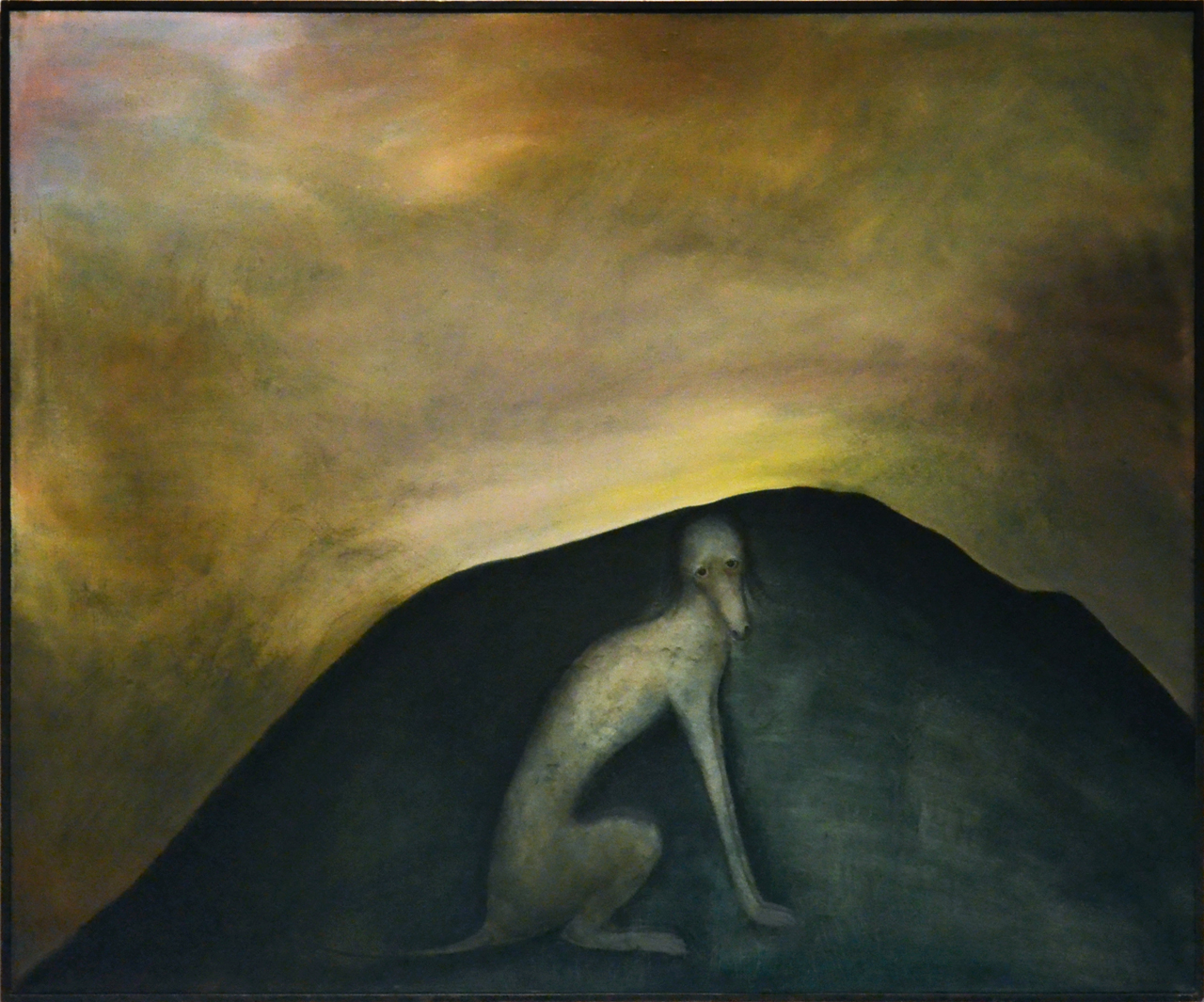
Filip the dog (1966), oil, National Gallery Prague

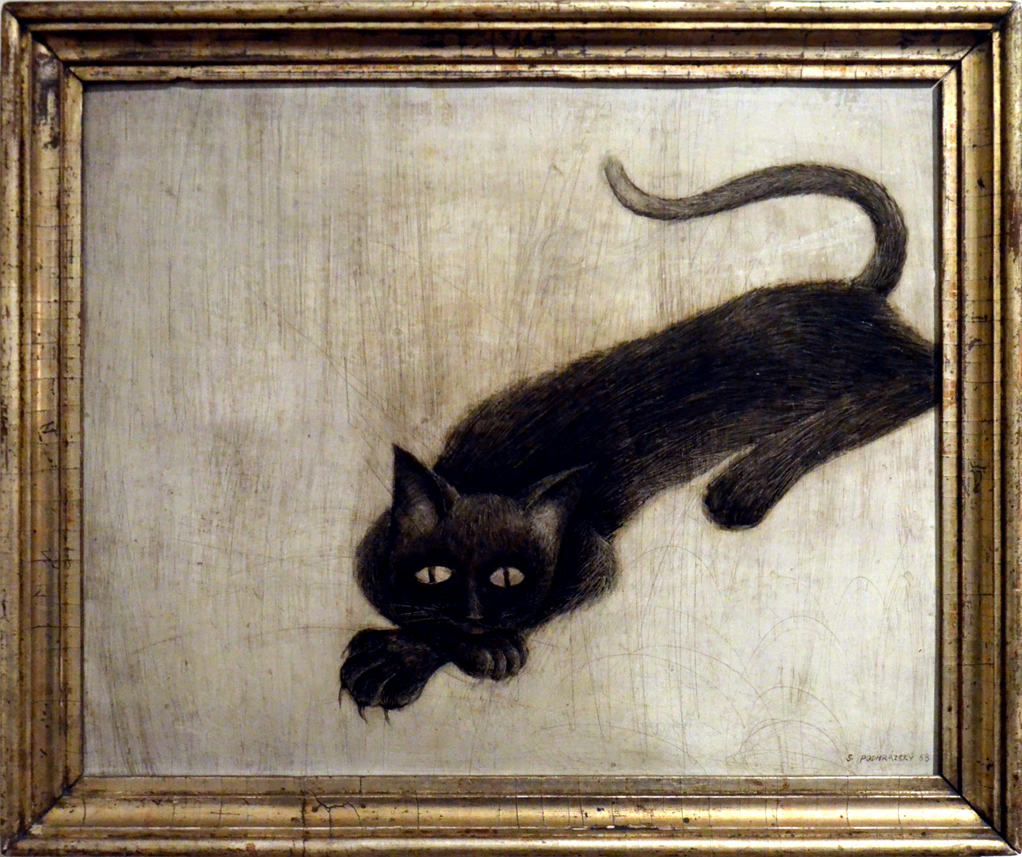
Cat glutton (1968), oil

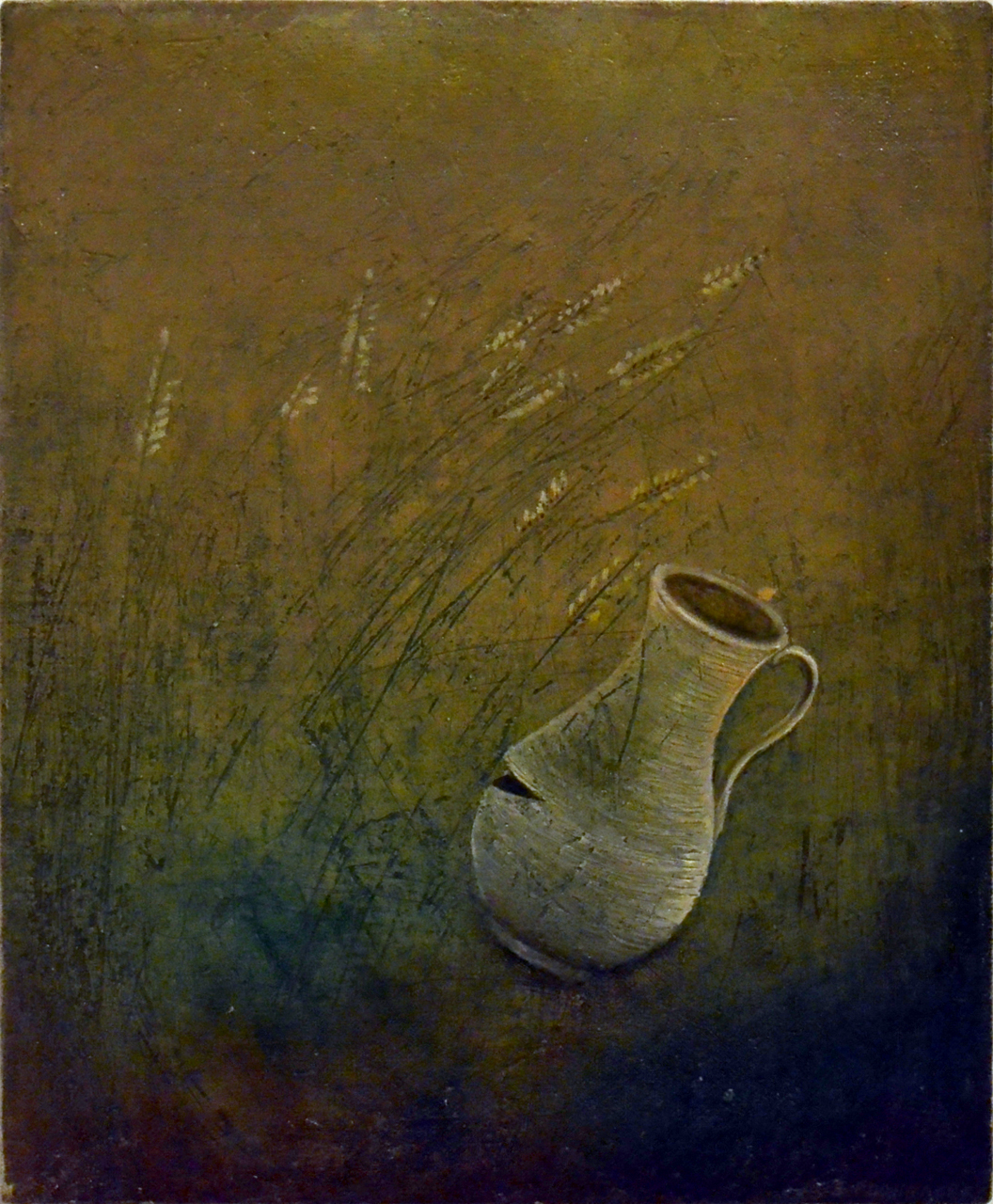
Jug (1971)

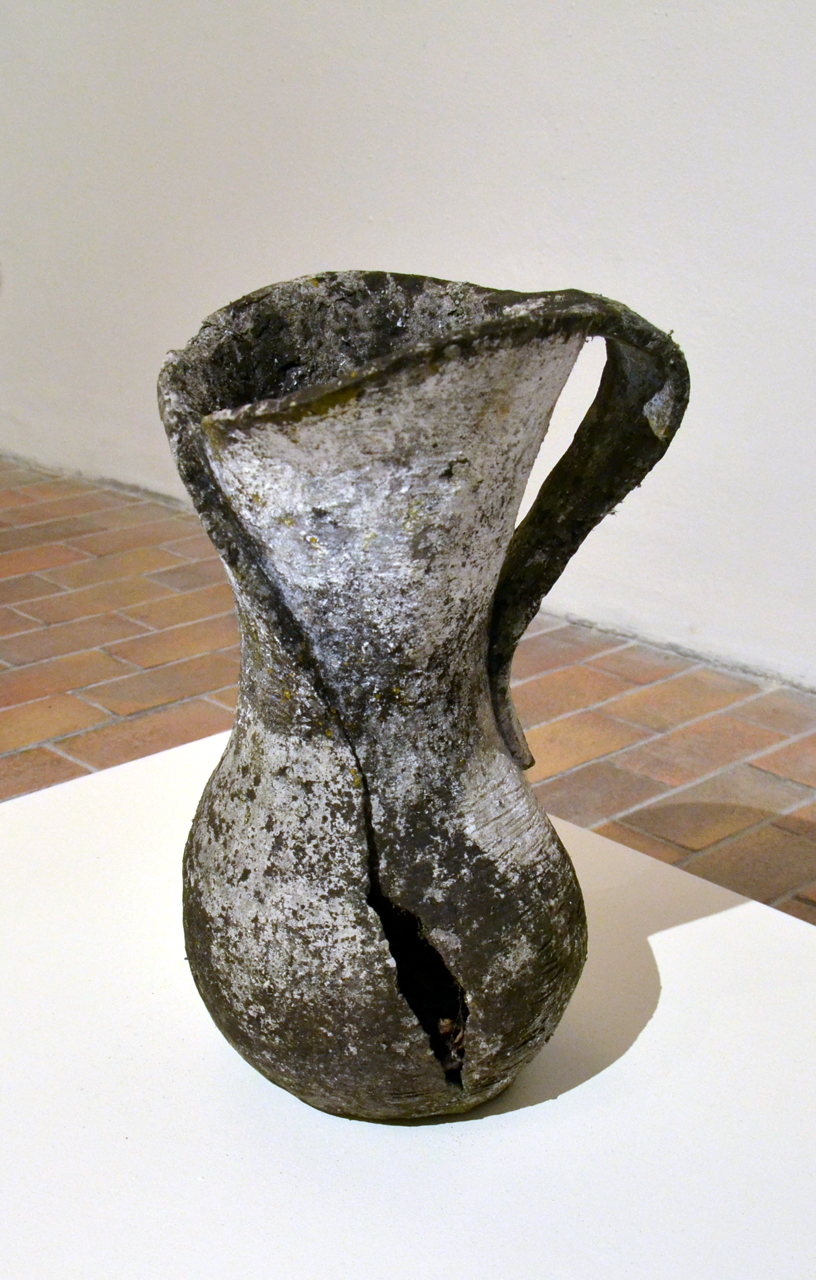
Jug

=== Restoration, frescoes ===
In the 1950s, restoration of sgraffito plasterwork in Slovakia and southern Bohemia was a means of livelihood for Podhrázský. Here he applied his craftsmanship acquired at the painting school of the Vienna decorator E. Dvířka and the masonry experience gained from his father.

In 1973 he repaired the main portal and the riding hall of Litomyšl Castle with Zdeněk Palcr. The following year the conservationists decided to completely renovate the Renaissance façades of the castle. This required the completion of the missing and damaged renaissance sgraffiti and offered Podhrázský the opportunity to create entirely new large-scale drawings. He was tempted to master vast areas, the largest of which measured 8 × 3.5 m. He confirmed in an interview, that he personally gained a lot from this work and considered the fine ground of sgraffito plaster ideal for drawing. Here he applied his knowledge of renaissance painting as well as his own free invention. Podhrázský's work includes, for example, the entire reconstructed fabion cornice with lunettes, which was rebuilt after the baroque construction interventions were removed, as well as more than 90% of the mirror motifs of the newly created sgraffito patterns. The reconstructed Litomyšl Castle was registered as a UNESCO World Heritage Site.

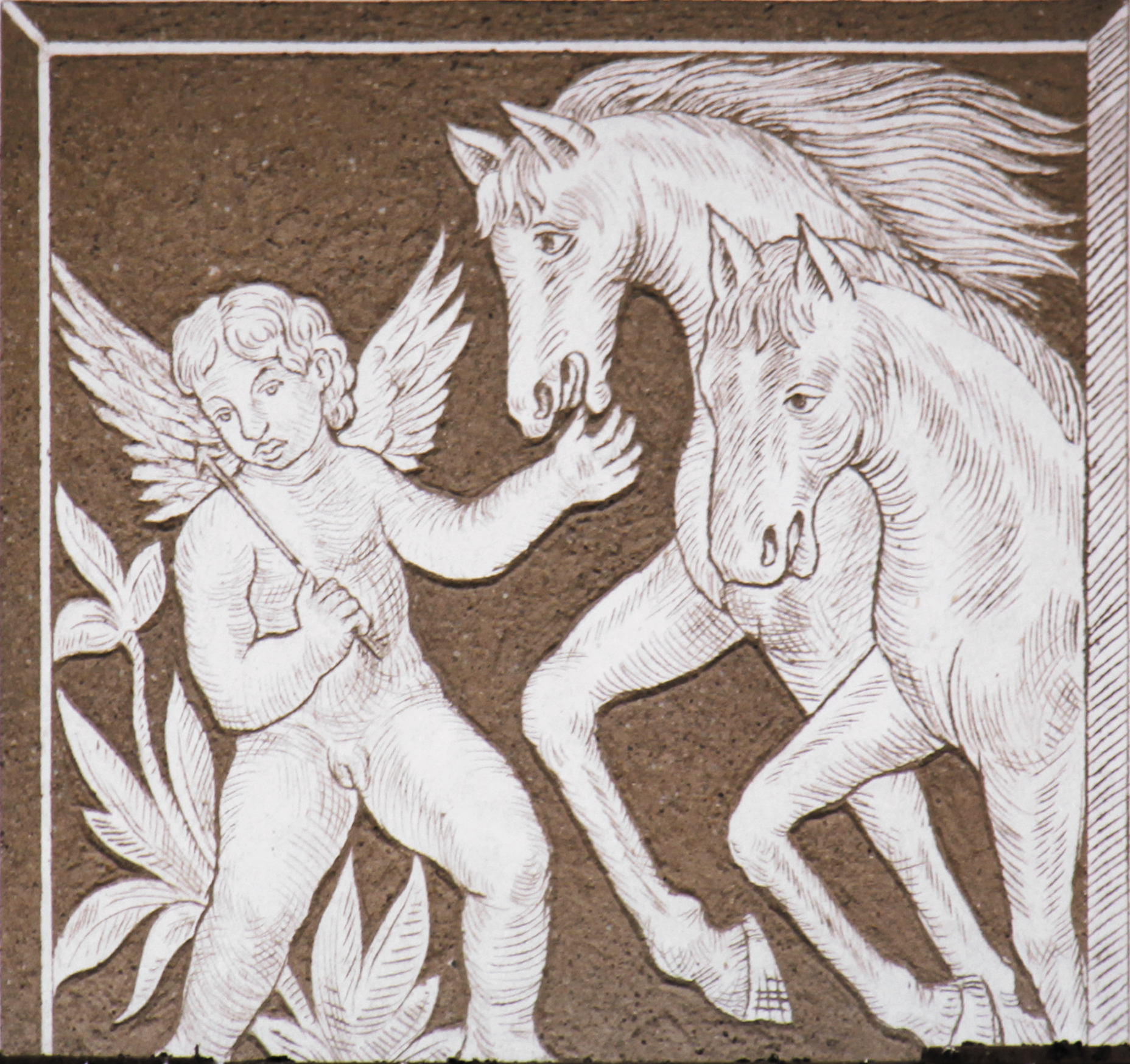
Amor, sgrafitto, Litomyšl Castle

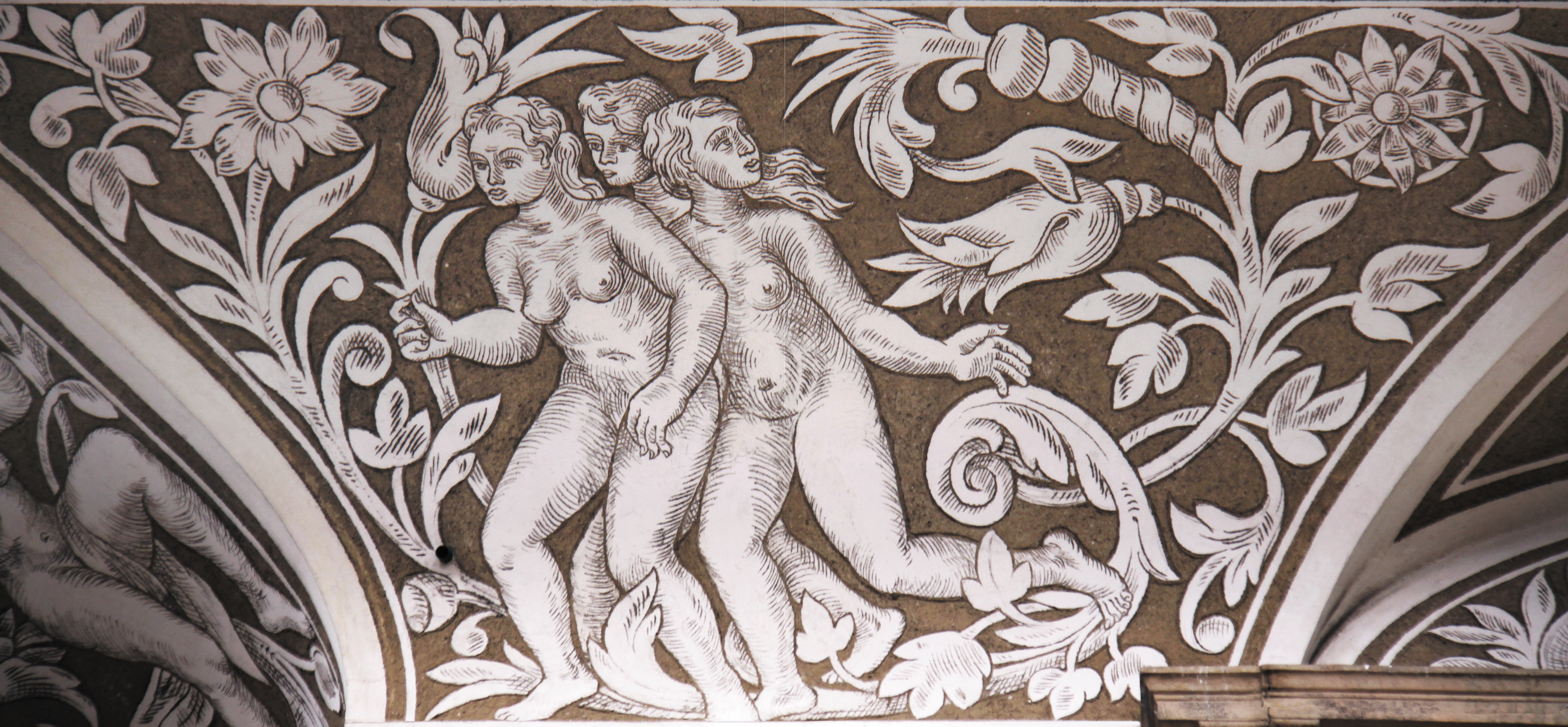
Lunette II, sgrafitto, Litomyšl Castle

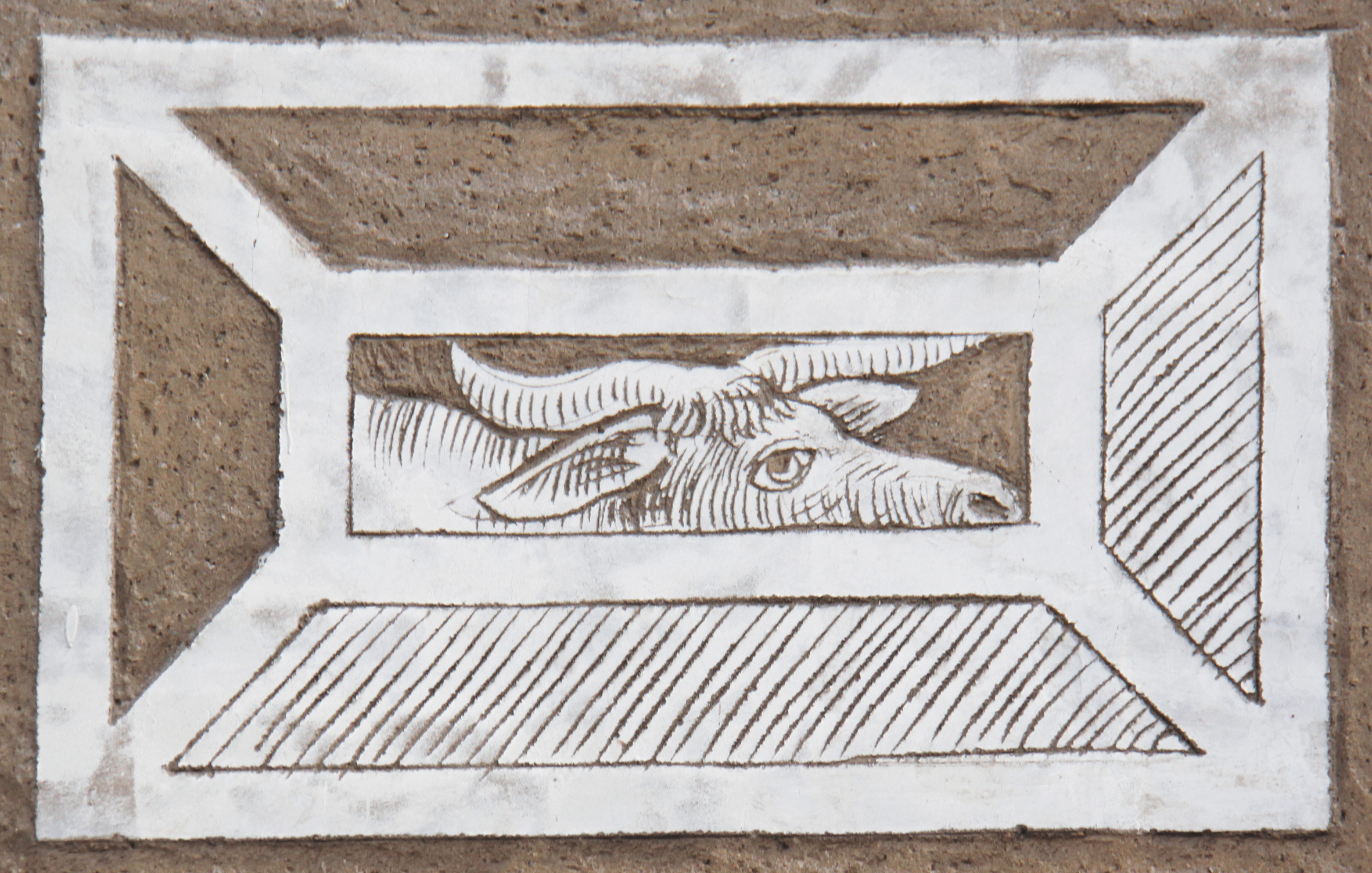
Sgraffito pattern IV, Litomyšl Castle

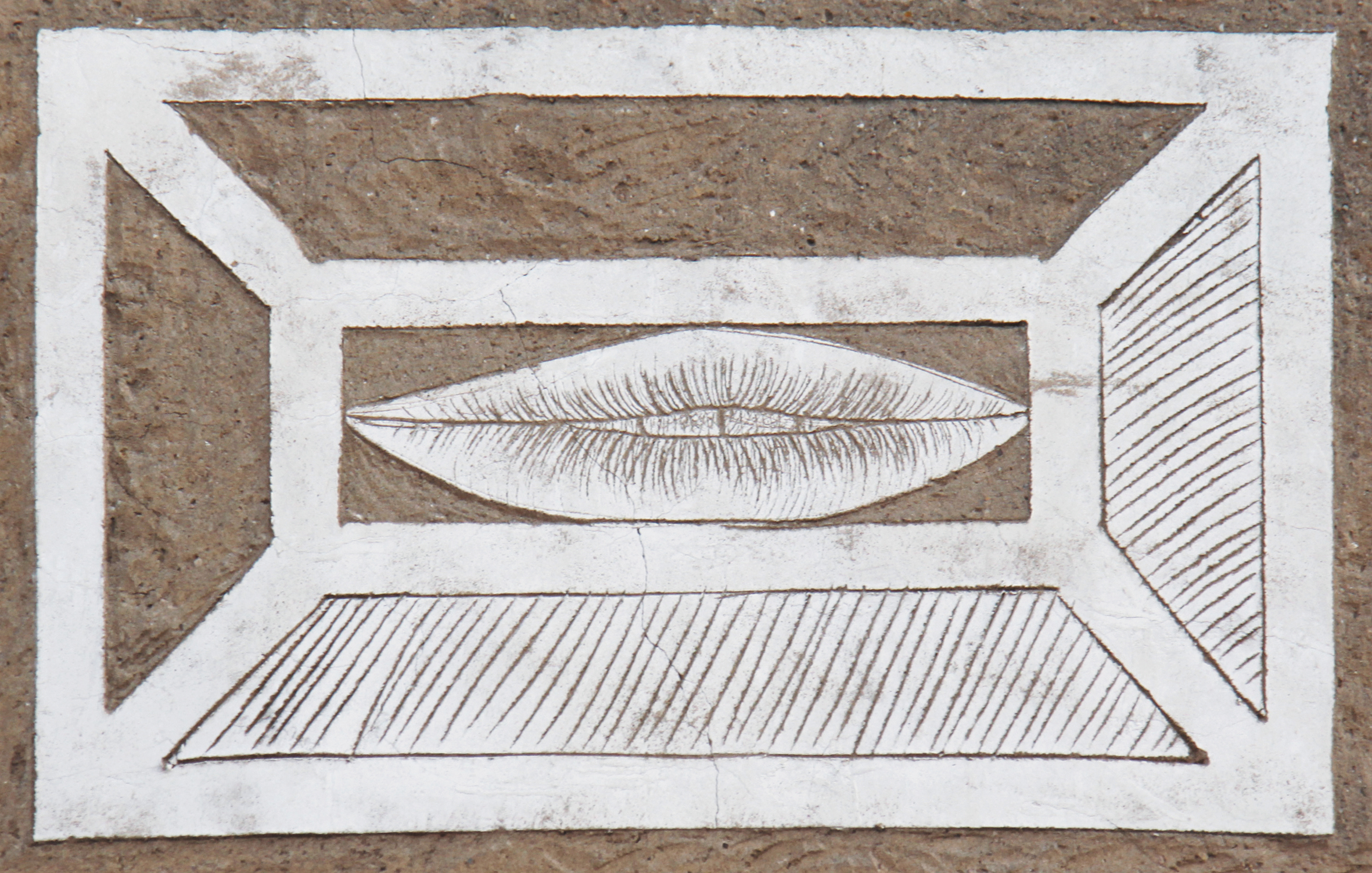
Sgraffito pattern V, Litomyšl Castle

In 1977, Podhrázský and architect V. Pala realized fresco in the main hall of the mourning hall in Luhačovice. He created a series of stylized human faces on an area of 3 × 15 m. Other sgraffito designs (Le Murate, Florence, Old Town Hall, Prague) for arch. V. Rudiš were not realized.

=== Amateur films ===
Podhrázský was interested in film at the turn of the 1940s and 1950s, and together with Miloslav Chlupáč made slapstick films inspired by Charlie Chaplin. His first wife Olga Milotová and his classmate Josef Lehoučka starred in the film "Dear of the Seven Robbers". Other grotesques were filmed during winter stays in a cottage on Liščí hora in the Giant Mountains. They ironically inverted the tragedy of the 1950s in short situational scenes thematizing the struggle for bare life, with elements of black humour.

The daughter of Stanislav Podhrázský and Olga Milotová, Jana Chytilová, is a director who professionally focuses on visual arts in her television work.

=== Representation in collections ===
- National Gallery Prague
- Centre Georges Pompidou
- National Museum in Wrocław
- Prague City Gallery
- Czech Museum of Fine Arts in Prague (currently Gallery of the Central Bohemian Region in Kutná Hora)
- Gallery of Modern Art in Roudnice nad Labem
- South Bohemian Gallery in Hluboká nad Vltavou
- Gallery of Art Karlovy Vary
- Gallery of Modern Art in Hradec Králové
- East Bohemian Gallery in Pardubice
- Klatovy-Klenová Gallery
- Regional Gallery in Liberec
- Museum of Art Olomouc
- private collections at home and abroad

=== Exhibitions (selection) ===
==== Author's ====
- 1969 Paintings and drawings, Václav Špála Gallery, Prague
- 1969 Regional Gallery, Hradec Králové, State Gallery of Fine Arts in Cheb
- 1971 Paintings, drawings, Karlovy Vary Art Gallery
- 1972 North Bohemian Gallery of Fine Arts in Litoměřice
- 1982 Paintings - drawings, Municipal Cultural Centre, Dobříš
- 1991 Selected Works, Nová síň Gallery, Prague
- 1995 State Gallery of Fine Arts in Náchod, Gallery of Modern Art in Roudnice nad Labem
- 2001 Stanislav Podhrázský: 1920-1999, Litomyšl Castle, ČMVU, Exhibition Hall Husova 19-21, Prague
- 2013/2014 Restless Beauty, House at the Stone Bell, Prague City Gallery
- 2023/2024 Stanislav Podhrázský and Friends, Gallery of the Central Bohemian Region in Kutná Hora

==== Collective ====
- 1957 Young Art / Creative Group Máj 57, Municipal House, Prague
- 1958/59 Art of Young Artists of Czechoslovakia 1958. Paintings and sculptures, Prague Castle Riding Hall, Brno House of Arts
- 1961 Máj Creative Group, Poděbrady
- 1964 Máj Creative Group, Nová síň Gallery, Prague
- 1965 5th Biennale Internazionale d'Arte Contemporanea della Repubblica di San Marino
- 1965 Object, Václav Špála Gallery, Prague
- 1965 Małarstwo a rzeźba z Pragi, Kraków
- 1966 Current Tendencies of Czech Art. Paintings, sculptures, graphics, Prague
- 1967 Mostra d'arte contemporanea cecoslovacca, Castello del Valentino, Turin
- 1967 Fantasy Aspects of Contemporary Czech Art, Regional Gallery of the Highlands in Jihlava, Václav Špála Gallery, Prague
- 1967 Painting 67. National Exhibition of Contemporary Painting, Moravian Museum of Arts and Crafts, Brno
- 1968 The Beginnings of a Generation, Václav Špála Gallery, Prague
- 1968 300 Painters, Sculptors, Graphic Artists of 5 Generations for 50 Years of the Republic, Prague
- 1969 Tschechische Malerei des 20. Jahrhunderts, Ausstellungsräume Berlin 12, Berlin
- 1969 Image 69. National Exhibition of Contemporary Painting, Moravian Museum of Decorative Arts, Brno
- 1978 Pittura céca contemporanea, Palazzo del Monte, Padua
- 1980 Zeitgenössische Kunst aus der Tschechoslowakei, Wessenberghaus, Konstanz
- 1983 Dessins tchèques du 20e siècle, Centre George Pompidou, Paris
- 1989 Restoration Art 1948-1988, Mánes, Prague
- 1992 Czech Fine Art 1960-1990, Central Bohemian Gallery, Exhibition Halls, Prague
- 1994 Focal Points of Rebirth, Municipal Library, Prague
- 1996 Art when time stood still, Czech Art Scene 1969-1985, Prague, Brno, Cheb
- 1999/2000 Art of Accelerated Time. Czech Art Scene 1958 - 1968, Prague, Cheb
- 2000/2001 100 + 1 art works of the Twentieth Century, House of the Black Mother of God, Prague
- 2004/06 The sixties from the collection of the Zlatá husa Gallery in Prague, Brno House of Arts, Karlovy Vary Art Gallery
- 2007 Máj 57 Group, Prague Castle, Imperial Stables, Prague
- 2010 Years in Days. Czech Art 1945-1957, Municipal Library, Prague
- 2012/2013 Verführung Freiheit: Kunst in Europa seit 1945, Deutsches Historisches Museum, Berlin
- 2013 The Desire For Freedom: Arte in Europa dal 1945 (XXX mostra del Consiglio d’Europa), Palazzo Reale, Milan
- 2016/2017 Facing the Future: Art in Europe 1945-68, BOZAR - Palais des Beaux-Art / Paleis voor Schone Kunsten / Centre for Fine Arts, Brussels, Karlsruhe, Moscow
- 2018 The Anatomy of a Leap into the Void: The Year 1968 and Art in Czechoslovakia, exhibition hall Masné krámy, Plzeň
- 2021 Confrontation 1960–1970, Moderna Gallery, Prague
- 2024 Heptameron: Surrealism and the Dream of the Renaissance, South Bohemian Gallery in Hluboká nad Vltavou

== Sources ==
=== Monographs ===
- Jan Kříž, Helena Zemanová: Stanislav Podhrázský 1920-1999, Czech Museum of Fine Arts, Prague 2001, ISBN 80-7056-097-5
- Marie Klimešová (ed.), Stanislav Podhrázský, Arbor vitae, Řevnice 2013, ISBN 978-80-7467-037-4.
- Adriana Primusová, Stanislav Podhrázský a přátelé / and Friends, GASK Kutná Hora 2023, ISBN 978-80-7056-245-1

=== Catalogues (selection) ===
- Stanislav Podhrázský, text by Jan Kříž, SČVU, Praha 1966
- Stanislav Podhrázský: paintings from 1962-66'', text by Alena Konečná, Czech Fine Arts Fund, Brno 1966
- Stanislav Podhrázský, text by Jaromír Zemina, Czech artists union, Prague 1969
- Stanislav Podhrázský: paintings, drawings, text Bohumír Mráz, Karlovy Vary Art Gallery 1971
- Stanislav Podhrázský, text Jaromír Zemina, GVU Litoměřice 1972
- Stanislav Podhrázský: paintings - drawings, Dobříš, text Vladimíra Eidernová, Marie A. Černá, Dílo - ČFVU, Prague 1982
- Stanislav Podhrázský: selections from his works, text by Jan Kříž, Nová síň, Prague 1991
- Stanislav Podhrázský, text by Jan Kapusta Jr, State Gallery in Náchod 1995, ISBN 80-85057-45-X

=== General sources ===
- Tvůrčí skupina Máj, Galerie Nová síň, Praha 1964
- Vª biennale internazionale d´arte contemporanea della Repubblica di San Marino, San Marino 1965
- Mostra d'arte contemporanea cecoslovacca, Torino 1967
- Němec J, Współczesna plastyka z Pragi, Sopoty 1967
- 300 Painters, Sculptors, Graphic Artists of 5 Generations for 50 Years of the Republic, Union of Czechoslovak Visual Artists, Prague 1968
- Künstlergruppe arche mit 10 Malern aus Prag, Hameln, Dortmund 1968
- Dvořák J, Kohoutek J, Tschechische Malerei des 20. Jahrhunderts, Ausstellungsräume Berlin 12, Berlín 1969
- Mrázová M, Pittura céca contemporanea, Padova 1978
- Mrázová M, Leiner U, Zeitgenössische Kunst aus der Tschechoslowakei, Wessenberghaus, Konstanz 1980
- Hermansdorfer M, Ojrzyńska J, Wspołczesna sztuka czeska. Kolekcja Janiny Ojrzyńskiej, Muzeum Narodowe we Wrocławiu 1984
- Šedá cihla: 78/1985, Jazzová sekce, Praha 1985
- Hlobil I et al., Restaurátorské umění / Restoration art 1948-1988, Mánes, Prague 1989
- Chalupecký J, Nové umění v Čechách / New Art in Bohemia, H&H, Ars pictura, vol. 1., Jinočany 1994, ISBN 80-85787-81-4
- Neumann I, Potůčková A (eds.), Umění zastaveného času / Art when time stood still, Česká výtvarná scéna 1969–1985, cat. 268 p., cs., en., ČMVU, Prague 1996, ISBN 80-7056-050-9
- Potůčková A (ed.), Umění zrychleného času, Česká výtvarná scéna 1958–1968 / The Art of Accelerated Time, Czech Art Scene 1958-1968, cat. 147 p., cs., en., ČMVU Prague 1999, ISBN 80-7056-068-1
- Juříková M, Železný V, Šedesátá / The sixties, 414 p., cs, en, Zlatá husa Gallery, Prague 2004, ISBN 80-239-3406-6
- Klimešová M, Primusová A, The Máj 57 Group. Efforts for artistic freedom at the turn of the 1950s and 1960s, Prague Castle Administration, Prague 2007, ISBN 978-80-903876-1-4
- Klimešová M, Years in Days: Czech Art 1945-1957, Arbor vitae Řevnice, Prague City Gallery 2010, ISBN 978-80-87164-35-8
- Musilová H, Vachtová L, Anatomie skoku do prázdna / The Anatomy of a Leap into the Void (Rok 1968 a výtvarné umění v Československu / The Year 1968 and Art in Czechoslovakia), West Bohemian Gallery, Plzeň 2018, ISBN 978-80-88027-26-3

=== Encyclopedias ===
- Anděla Horová (ed), The New Czech Encyclopedia of Fine Arts N-Z, 558 s., Academia, publishing house of the Academy of Sciences of the Czech Republic 1995, ISBN 80-200-0522-6
- Dictionary of Czech and Slovak Visual Artists 1950-2003 (XI. Pau - Pop), Chagall Art Centre, Ostrava 2003
