= Anna Fárová =

Czech-French art historian

Anna Fárová (1 June 1928 – 27 February 2010) was a Czech-French art historian who specialised and catalogued Czech and Czechoslovak photographers, including František Drtikol and Josef Sudek. She was one of the pioneers of writing on history of photography. Her publishing activities helped to establish photography, as an art discipline within the country.

== Biography ==
Fárová was born in 1928 in Paris, to a Czech diplomat, Miloš Šafránek, and a French teacher, Anne Moussu. She spent a part of her early childhood in Paris, the family moved to Plzeň, Czechoslovakia only in the middle of the 1930s. Following her studies at the French gymnasium in Prague she continued studying art history and aesthetics at the Faculty of Arts of the Charles University in Prague. In 1952, she married Czech artist Libor Fára. In 1956, her father arranged a meeting with photographer Henri Cartier-Bresson. The meeting heavily influenced her career. She began working with the Magnum Photos agency, co-founded by Cartier-Bresson, and published a series of monographs in the Czech publishing house Odeon.

She held a number of photo exhibitions across Prague. However, the Communist era Czechoslovak government banned Fárová from working in the country after she became a signatory of the Charter 77 manifesto in the 1970s. Much of her work was published outside of Czechoslovakia during the 1980s, before the Velvet Revolution and fall of communism.

Fárová died of a serious illness on 27 February 2010, at the age of 81.
