= Libor Fára =

Czech sculptor and painter

Libor Fára (12 September 1925 – 3 March 1988) was a Czechoslovak sculptor and painter.

== Biography ==
Fára was born in Prague. The versatile Fára graduated from the Academy of Applied Arts in Prague in the studio of Emil Filla in the second half of the 1940s, developing his artistic opinion in the circle of the Prague Surrealists. The main fields of Fára’s interest were collages, assemblages and objects as well as photography. During the 1950s, Fára participated at various activities of artists, writers and theoreticians from the circle of Karel Teige. Even though his works, based on poetic construction were not created spontaneously, they recollect the production of the Fluxus movement. During the 1960s, Fára collaborated with the Prague's Theatre on the Balustrade for which he created many timeless stage designs and posters.

Fára is represented in the permanent collections of various major art museums, including the National Gallery, Prague, Czech Museum of Fine Arts, Prague, Gallery of Modern Art, Roudnice nad Labem.

In 1952, he married the Czech art historian and photography theorist Anna Fárová.

He died in Prague in 1988.

== Bibliography ==
- Věra Velemanová; Vojtěch Lahoda: Libor Fára dílo, 2006, Nakladatel: Gallery, ISBN 80-86010-99-6
- Eva Petrová; Anna Fárová, Jan Rous, Věra Velemanová: Libor Fára , 1999, Nakladatel: Gema Art, ISBN 80-86087-17-4
